= Higher education in the United States =

Tertiary education in the United States

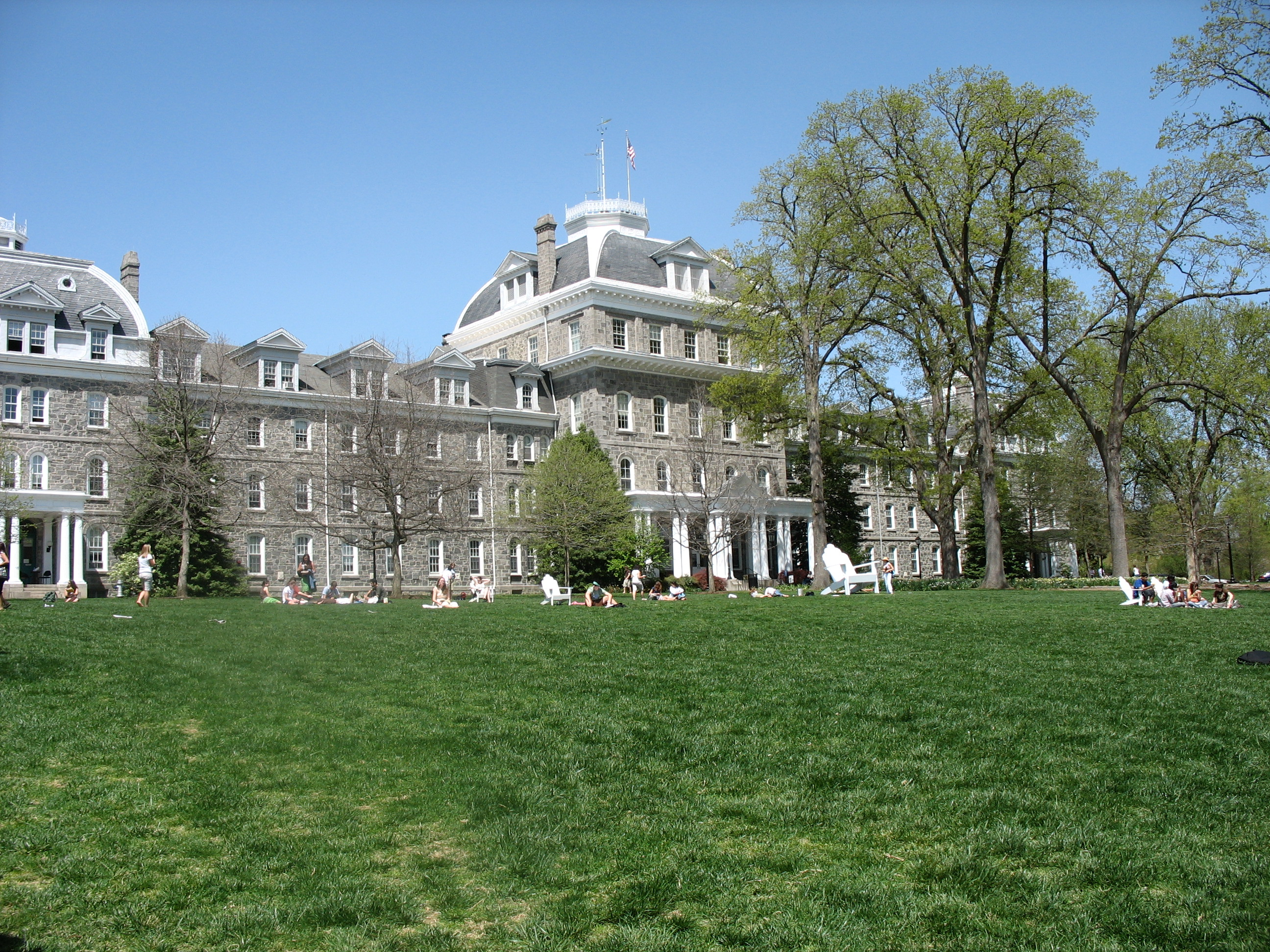
Swarthmore College, founded in 1864 in Swarthmore, Pennsylvania, one of the oldest coeducational colleges in the United States, is often considered a Little Ivy.

University of Connecticut School of Law in Hartford, Connecticut, one of only four public law schools in New England

In the United States, higher education is an optional stage of formal learning following secondary education. It is also referred to as post-secondary education, third-stage, third-level, or tertiary education. It covers stages 5 to 8 on the international ISCED 2011 scale. It is delivered at 3,931 Title IV degree-granting institutions, known as colleges or universities. These may be public or private universities, research universities, liberal arts colleges, community colleges, or for-profit colleges. U.S. higher education is loosely regulated by the government and by several third-party organizations and is in the process of being even more decentralized.

Post secondary (college, university) attendance was relatively rare through the early 20th century. Since the decades following World War II, however, attending college or university has been thought of as a "rite of passage" to which the American Dream is deeply embedded. Nonetheless, there is a growing skepticism of higher education in the U.S. and its value to consumers. U.S. higher education has also been criticized for encouraging a financial preference for the most prestigious institutions (e.g., Ivy League schools) over less selective institutions (e.g., community colleges).

In 2022, about 16 million students—9.6 million women and 6.6 million men—enrolled in degree-granting colleges and universities in the U.S. Of the enrolled students, 45.8% enrolled in a four-year public institution, 27.8% in a four-year private institution, and 26.4% in a two-year public institution (four-years is the generally expected time to complete a bachelor's degree, and two-years, an associate degree). College enrollment peaked in 2010–2011 and is projected to continue declining or be stagnant for the next two decades.

Strong research funding helped elite American universities dominate global rankings in the early 21st century, making them attractive to international students, professors and researchers. However, this dominance appears to be challenged by China in the 2020s.

Higher education in the U.S. is also unique in its investment in highly competitive NCAA sports, particularly in American football and basketball, with large sports stadiums and arenas adorning its campuses and bringing in billions in revenue.

== History ==
=== Colonial era to 19th century ===
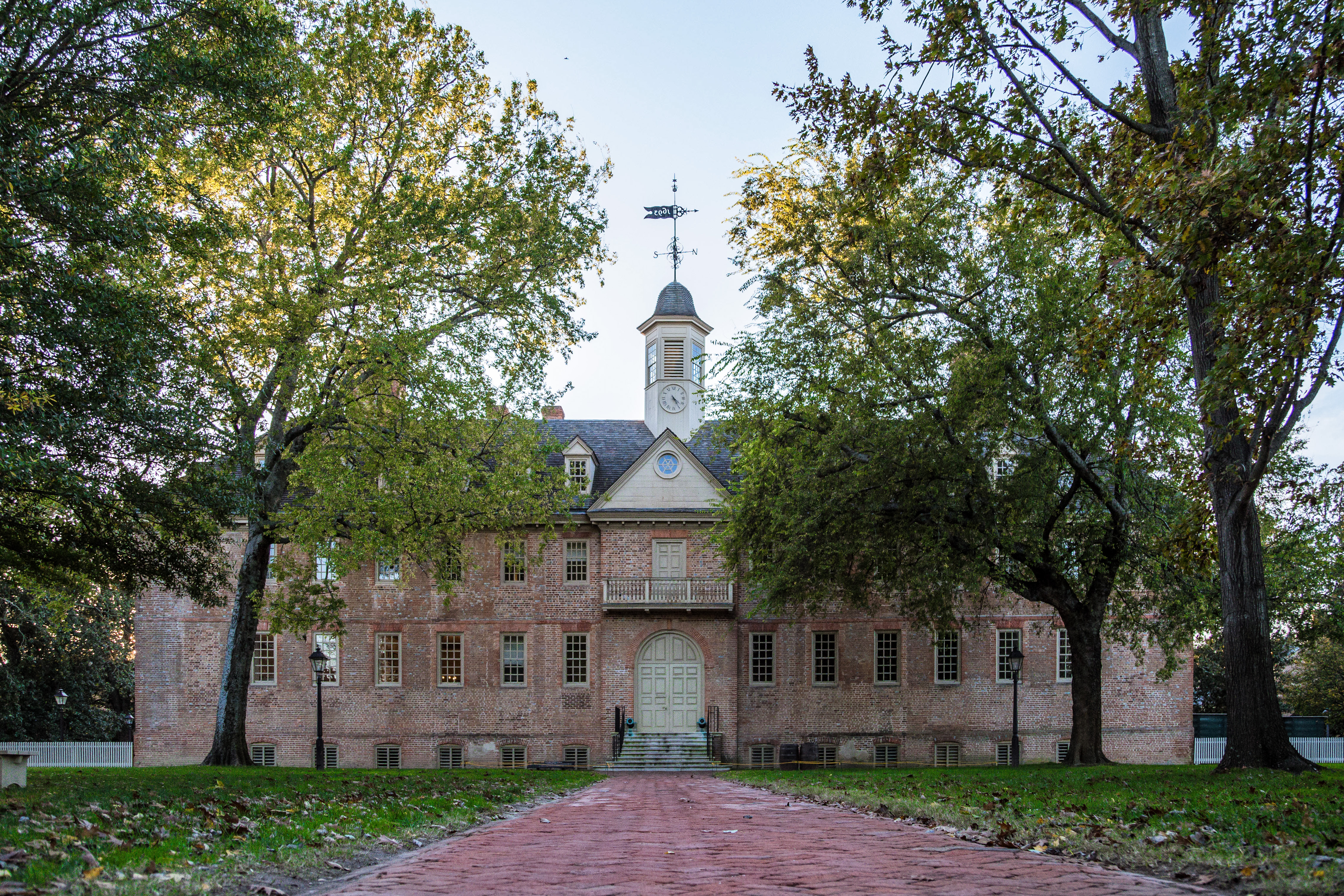
The Wren Building, built at the College of William & Mary in 1695, is the oldest academic building in the United States. The school held African slaves and their descendants for 170 years.

Religious denominations established early colleges in order to train white, male ministers. Between 1636 and 1776, nine colleges were chartered in Colonial America; today, these institutions are known as the colonial colleges. According to historian John Thelin, most instructors at these institutions were lowly paid 'tutors'. As objects of the slavocracy, African slaves and their descendants also served as free labor for more than a century and a half.

Besides slavery, violence-backed cession was an aspect of higher education growth. This involved more than 200 indigenous nations, nearly 160 treaties and the appropriation of 11 million acres of land.

Protestants and Catholics opened hundreds of small denominational colleges in the 19th century. In 1899 they enrolled 46 percent of all US undergraduates. Many closed or merged but in 1905 there were over 500 in operation. Catholics opened several women's colleges in the early 20th century. Schools were small, with a limited undergraduate curriculum based on the liberal arts. Students were drilled in Greek, Latin, geometry, ancient history, logic, ethics and rhetoric, with few discussions and no lab sessions. Originality and creativity were not prized, but exact repetition was rewarded. College presidents typically enforced strict discipline, and upperclassman enjoyed hazing freshman. Many students were younger than 17, and most colleges also operated a preparatory school. There were no organized sports, or Greek-letter fraternities, but literary societies were active. Tuition was low and scholarships were few. Many of their students were sons of clergymen; most planned professional careers as ministers, lawyers or teachers.

The nation's small colleges helped young men make the transition from rural farms to complex urban occupations. These schools promoted upward mobility by preparing ministers and providing towns with a core of community leaders. Elite colleges became increasingly exclusive and contributed little upward social mobility. By concentrating on ministers and the offspring of wealthy families, elite Eastern colleges such as Harvard, Columbia, and Princeton played a role in the formation of a Northeastern elite.

In some areas, public institutions of higher education were slow to take hold. For instance, although there was general support for expanding access to higher education through public institutions, private colleges and universities successfully hindered the establishment of a public university in Boston, Massachusetts until the 1860s. The competition between private and public institutions shaped the development of the mixed public-private character of higher education in the United States.

==== Catholic colleges and universities ====
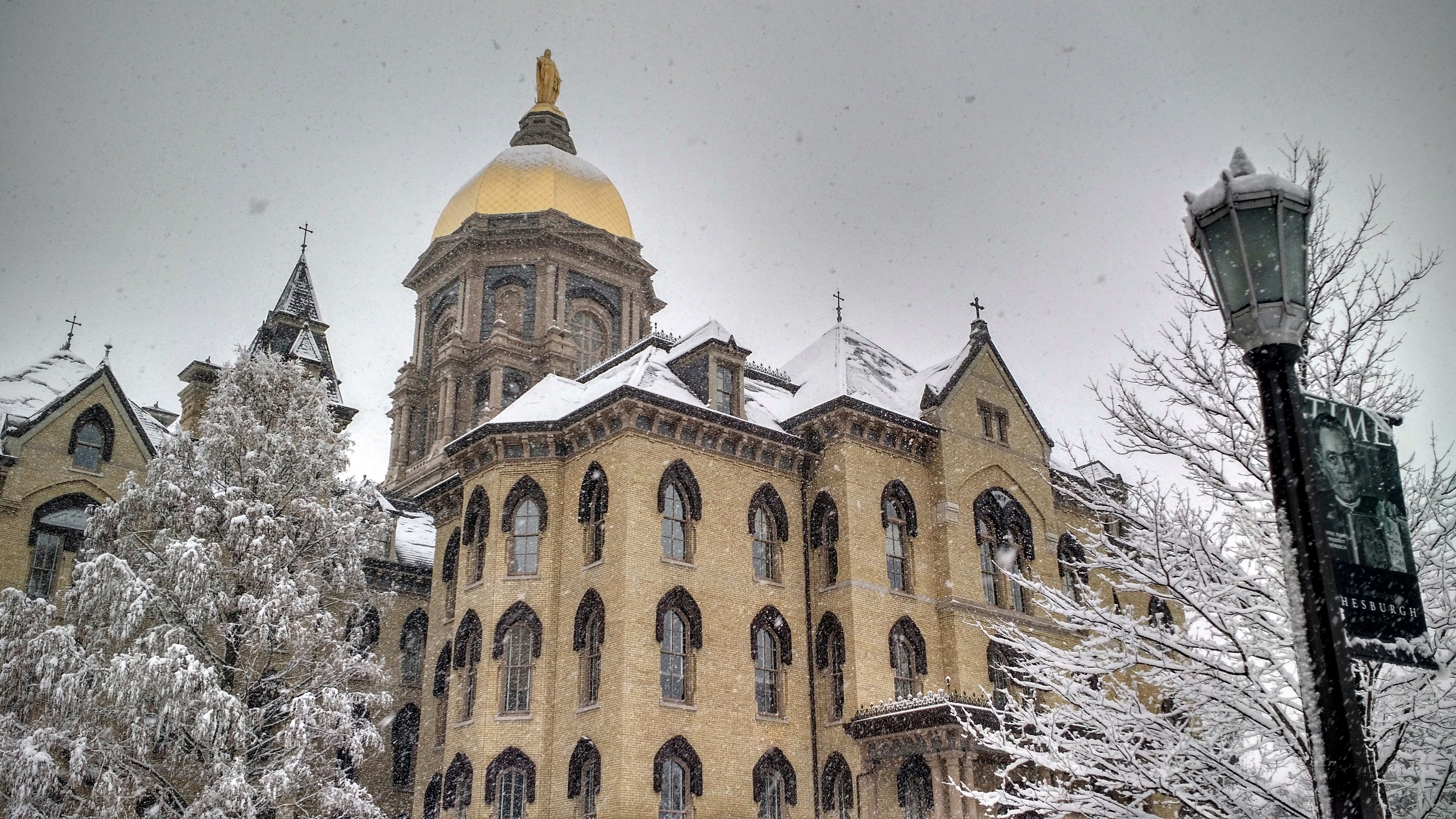
The Main Building at the University of Notre Dame, a prominent Catholic university in Notre Dame, Indiana

The Association of Catholic Colleges and Universities was founded in 1899 and continues to facilitate the exchange of information and methods. Vigorous debate in recent decades has focused on how to balance Catholic and academic roles, with conservatives arguing that bishops should exert more control to guarantee orthodoxy.

==== Historically black colleges and universities (HBCUs) ====
Most Historically Black Colleges and Universities were established in the South after the American Civil War, often with the assistance of religious missionary organizations based in the northern United States. HBCUs established prior to the American Civil War include Cheyney University of Pennsylvania in 1837, University of the District of Columbia then known as Miner School for Colored Girls in 1851 and Lincoln University in 1854. The second Morrill Act (1890) required that states consider black students equally or found separate land-grant schools for them.

Protests for civil rights on campus began in the early 20th century, at Shaw University (1919), Fisk University (1924–1925), Howard University (1925) and Hampton Institute (1925, 1927). The protests often involved civil rights issues between black students and white administrators.

=== Timeline of key federal legislation and executive actions ===
- Morrill Act (1862 and 1890)
- Smith–Hughes Act or National Vocational Education Act (1917)
- Federal Student Aid Program (1934–1943)
- G.I. Bill (1944)
- National Defense Education Act (1958)
- Higher Education Act (1965)
- Education Amendments (1972)
- Clery Act (1990)
- CARES Act, Coronavirus Relief packages, and American Rescue Plan (2020–2021)
- Dismantling the US Department of Education (2025)

=== 20th century ===
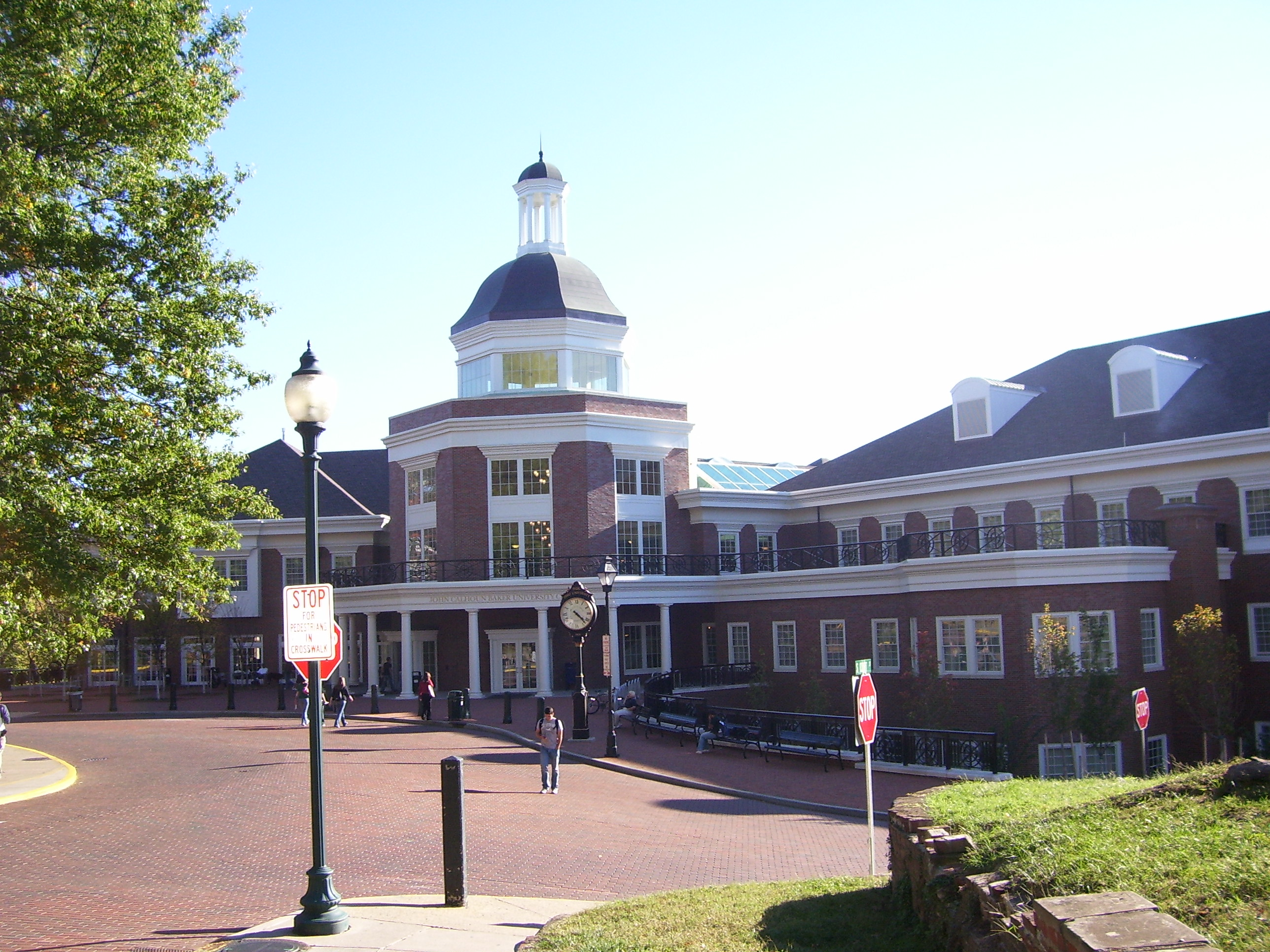
The open domed room anchoring Ohio University, which sits atop a hillside cut by Hocking River in Athens, Ohio

At the beginning of the 20th century, fewer than 1,000 colleges with 160,000 students existed in the US. The number of colleges dramatically increased in waves, during the early and mid-20th century. State universities grew from small institutions of fewer than 1,000 students to campuses with 40,000 more students, with networks of regional campuses around the state. In turn, regional campuses broke away and became separate universities.

To handle the explosive growth of K–12 education, every state set up a network of teachers' colleges, beginning with Massachusetts in the 1830s. After 1950, they became state colleges and then state universities with a broad curriculum.

Major new trends included the development of the junior colleges. They were usually set up by city school systems starting in the 1920s. By the 1960s they were renamed as "community colleges".

Junior colleges grew from 20 in number In 1909, to 170 in 1919. By 1922, 37 states had set up 70 junior colleges, enrolling about 150 students each. Meanwhile, another 137 were privately operated, with about 60 students each. Rapid expansion continued in the 1920s, with 440 junior colleges in 1930 enrolling about 70,000 students. The peak year for private institutions came in 1949, when there were 322 junior colleges in all; 180 were affiliated with churches, 108 were independent non-profit, and 34 were private schools run for-profit.

Many factors contributed to rapid growth of community colleges. Students parents and businessmen wanted nearby, low-cost schools to provide training for the growing white-collar labor force, as well as for more advanced technical jobs in the blue-collar sphere. Four-year colleges were also growing, albeit not as fast; however, many of them were located in rural or small-town areas away from the fast-growing metropolis. Community colleges continue as open-enrollment, low-cost institutions with a strong component of vocational education, as well as a low-cost preparation for transfer students into four-year schools. They appeal to a poorer, older, less prepared element.

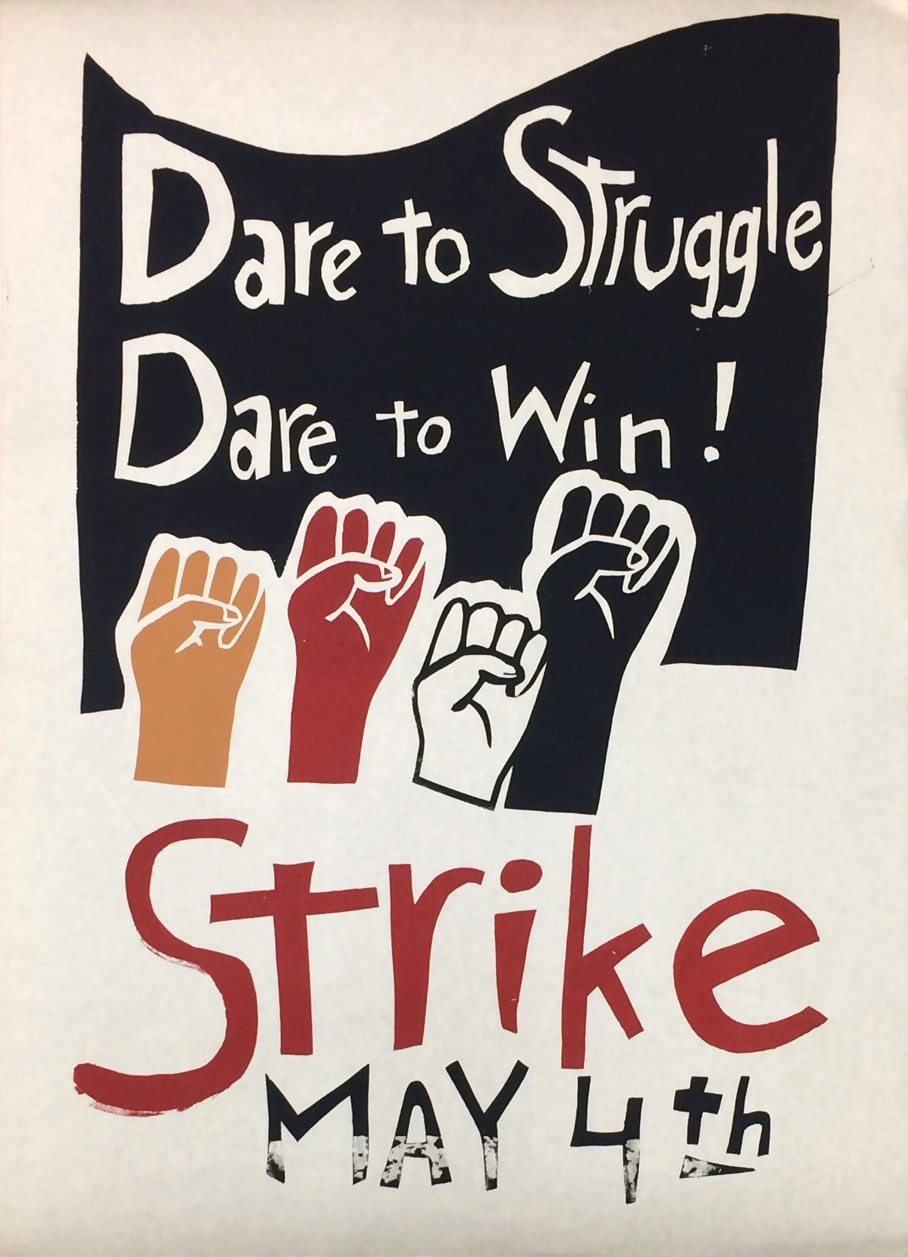
A poster publicizing the student strike of 1970. In the 1960s and 70s, colleges and universities became centers of social movements.

During the 1930s and 1940s, fear for the future of democracy impelled colleges and universities to define general education as preparation for citizenship in democratic society. In response, social scientists engaged in curricular reform, creating new general education courses and experimenting with progressive pedagogical methods. The result was a widespread form of social science general education by the mid-twentieth century in U.S. higher education.

College students were involved in social movements long before the 20th century, but the most dramatic student movements rose in the 1960s. In the 1960s, students organized for civil rights and against the Vietnam War. In the 1970s, students led movements for women's rights and gay rights, as well as protests against South African apartheid.

Privatization of US higher education increased in the 1980s and during economic recessions and austerity in the 20th and 21st century.

While a few for-profit colleges originated during Colonial times, these schools became major factors in the 1980s to about 2011, taking advantage of federal loan programs to pay student tuition. For-profit college enrollment, however, has declined significantly since 2011, after several federal investigations. For-profit colleges were criticized for predatory marketing and sales practices, and very poor records in terms of graduates getting jobs and repaying loans. The failures of Corinthian Colleges and ITT Technical Institute were the most remarkable closings. In 2018, the documentary Fail State chronicled the boom and bust of for-profit colleges, highlighting the abuses that led to their downfall.

=== 21st century ===
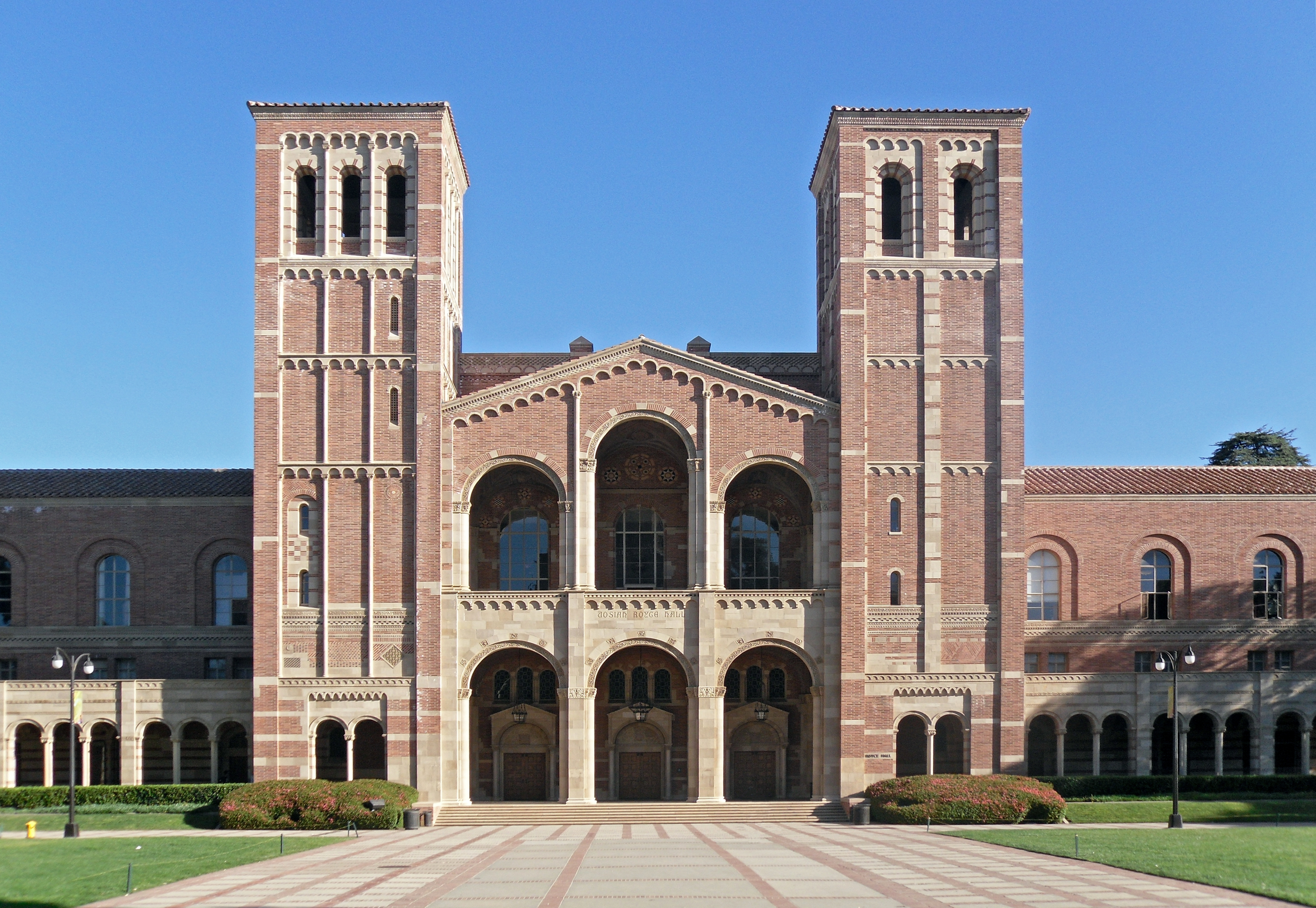
Royce Hall at the University of California, Los Angeles. In 2021, UCLA received 168,000 applicants, the most of any U.S. college or university.

Changing technology, mergers and closings, and politics have resulted in dramatic changes in US higher education during the 21st century.

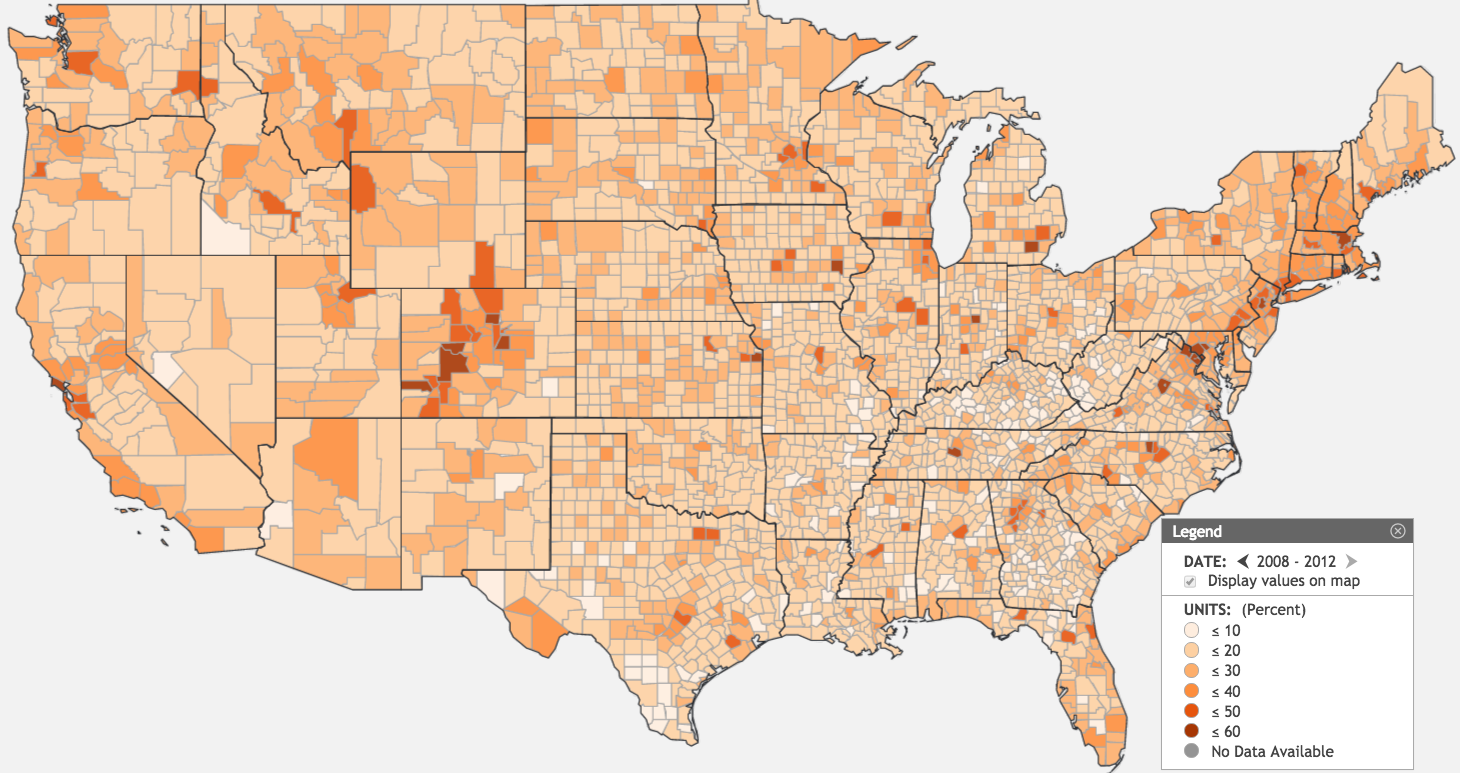
2008–2012 bachelor's degree or higher (5-year estimate) by county (percent)

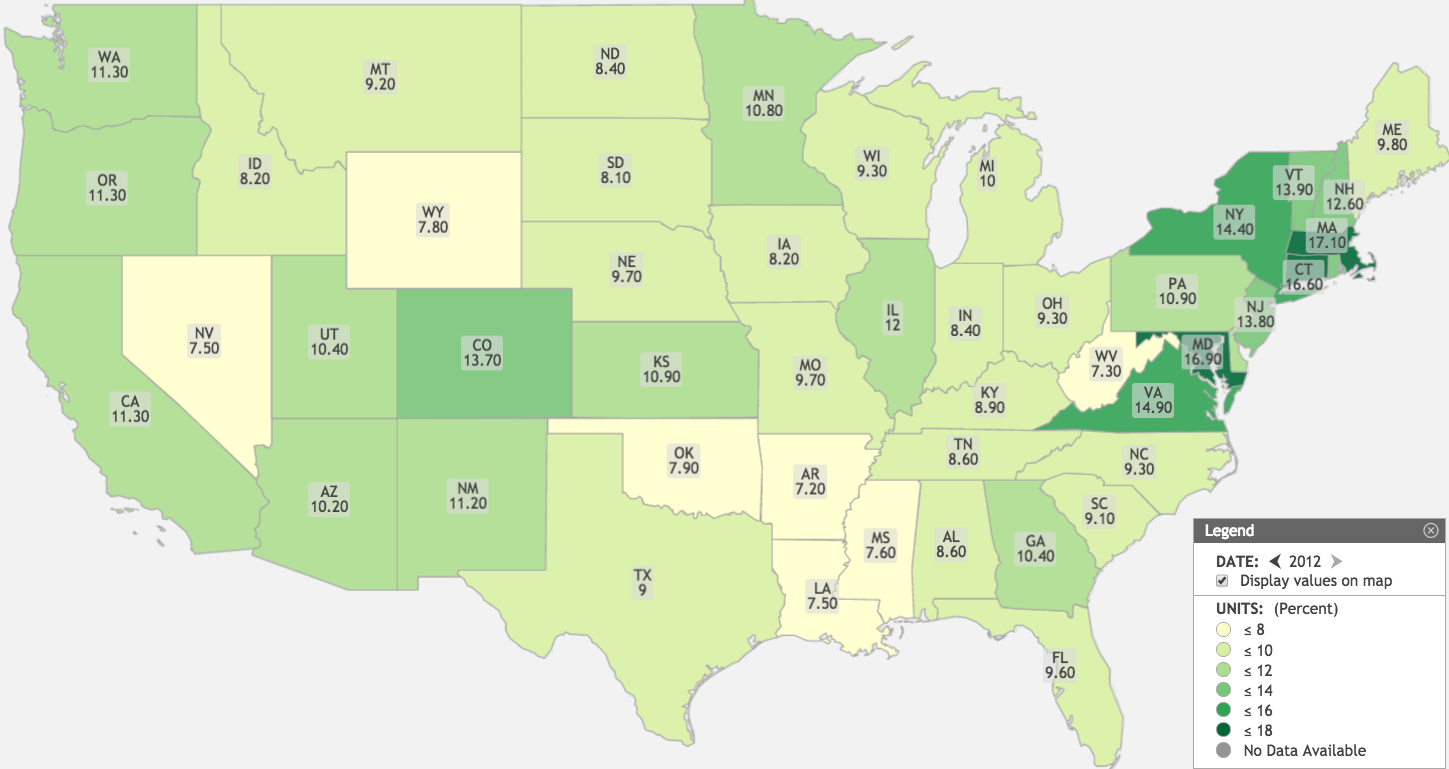
People 25 years and over who have completed an advanced degree by state (percent, 2012)

In 2020, when the COVID-19 pandemic upended regular campus life forcing students to take online classes at home, more than 100 colleges, both public and private were sued for tuition refunds, making many of them to reopen their campuses.

==== Edtech ====
Online education has grown in the early 21st century. In 2017, about 15% of all students attended exclusively online, and competition for online students has been increasing

A MOOC is a massive open online course aimed at unlimited participation and open access via the web. It became popular in 2010–14. Robert Zemsky (2014), of the University of Pennsylvania Graduate School of Education notes that they at first seemed to be an extremely inexpensive method of bringing top teachers at low cost directly to students. In 2019, researchers at MIT found that MOOCs had completion rates of 3 percent and that the number of people taking these courses has been declining since 2012–13.

By 2018, more than one hundred short-term coding bootcamps existed in the US. Programs were available at Harvard University's extension school and the extension schools at Georgia Tech, University of Pennsylvania, Cal Berkeley, Northwestern, UCLA, University of North Carolina, University of Texas, George Washington, Vanderbilt University, and Rutgers through Trilogy Education Services.

In 2019, researchers employed by George Mason University claimed that online education had "contributed to increasing gaps in educational success across socioeconomic groups while failing to improve affordability".

Online programs for many universities are often managed by privately owned companies called online program managers or OPMs. The OPMs include 2U, Risepoint, Noodle, and iDesign. Trace Urdan, managing director at Tyton Partners, estimated "that the market for OPMs and related services will be worth nearly $8 billion by 2020."

In 2023, the US Department of Education announced that OPMs would be subject to greater oversight, to include audits. Higher education institutions would be required to report details about their agreements with OPMs by May 1, 2023. Edtech expert Phil Hill recently said that the OPM model is now "on life support."

==== Financial crises, mergers and downsizing ====
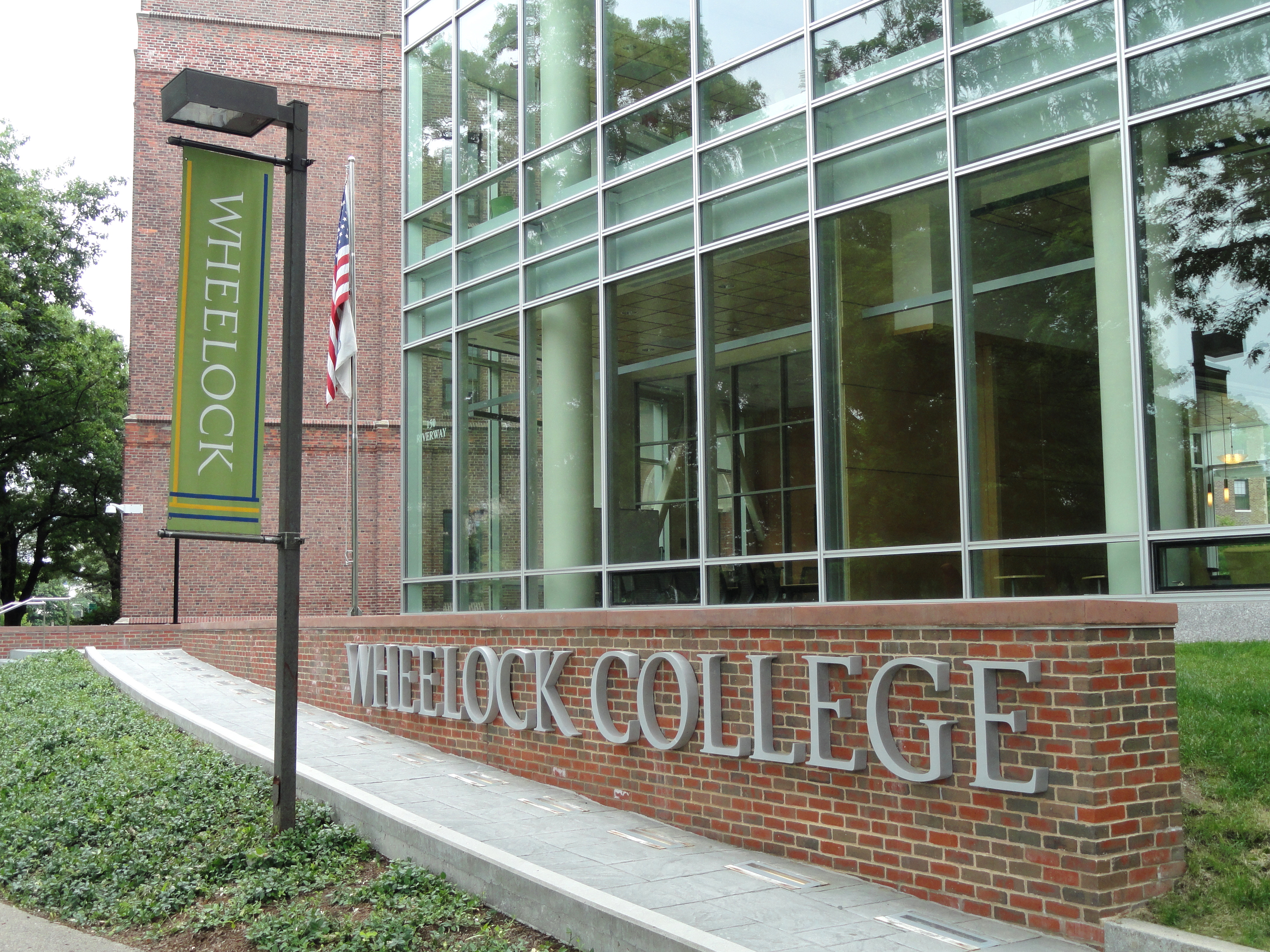
Wheelock College in Boston, Massachusetts, one of a number of colleges forced to close due to financial struggles

Hundreds of colleges are in financial trouble and many are expected to close or merge, according to research from Ernst & Young. The US Department of Education publishes a monthly list of campus and learning site closings. Typically there are 300 to 1000 closings per year. Notable college closings include for-profit Corinthian Colleges (2015), ITT Technical Institute (2016), Brightwood College and Virginia College (2018). Private college closings include Wheelock College (2018) and Green Mountain College (2019).

In December 2017, Moody's credit rating agency downgraded the US higher education outlook from stable to negative, "citing financial strains at both public and private four-year institutions." In June 2018, Moody's released data on declining college enrollments and constraints, noting that tuition pricing would suppress tuition revenue growth.

Other businesses related to higher education have also had financial difficulties. In May 2019, two academic publishers, Cengage and McGraw Hill, merged.

In 2020, higher education lost 650,000 jobs or about 13 percent of the workforce amid the COVID-19 pandemic, despite an infusion of federal funds. The number of US postsecondary institutions receiving Title IV funding has dropped from 7,253 in 2012–2013 to 5,916 in 2020–2021.

==== Preparedness for college ====
According to the ACT, "only 1 in 5 high schoolers in the class of 2023 graduated ready to succeed in their core introductory classes in college—even though most believe they are well-prepared."

As reported by the 2024 ACT Profile Report, “27% of girls and 32% of boys met the minimum mathematics college readiness benchmark. In science, 29% of girls and 32% of boys met the minimum mathematics college readiness benchmark.”. These figures detail the STEM readiness benchmark gap between genders.

A study by the ACT found, “lower-income students are more likely to have lower ACT scores than higher-income students; however, they are also more likely to have lower high school GPAs and to take less rigorous coursework in high school.”

==== Class privilege and the growth of the educated underclass ====
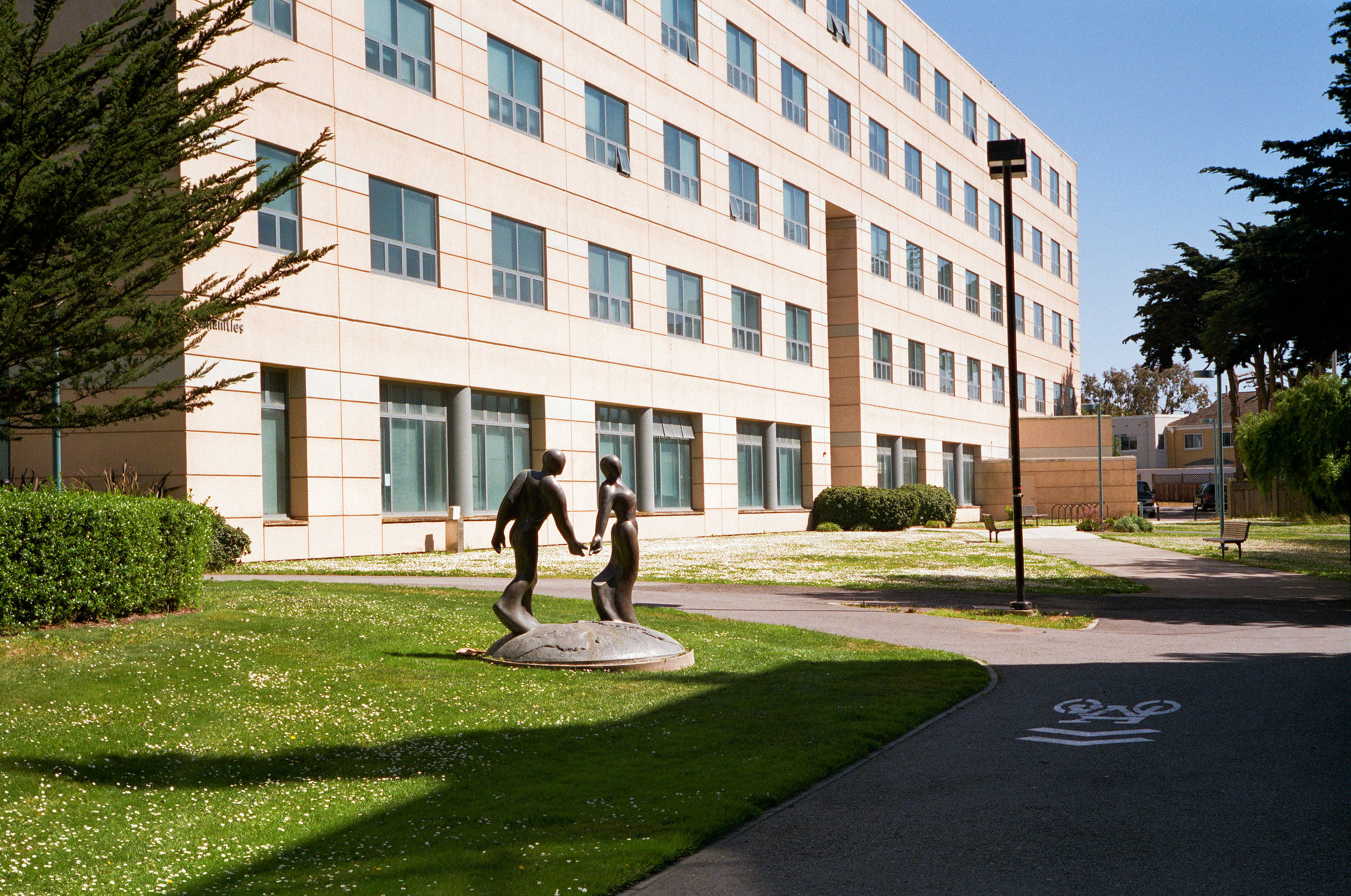
The Humanities Building at San Francisco State University

Social class has a profound influence on higher education. Undergraduates at elite universities have a substantial advantage if their parents also went to a particular college. Educator Gary Roth, a left-wing writer, has argued that with fewer good jobs for graduates, the US has been producing an "educated underclass." While upward social mobility continues to be available for immigrants and first generation people, the route to upward social mobility is more complicated for people from families that have been in the US longer.

==== Protests, political clashes, and the growth of right-wing politics ====
The growth of power among right wing groups has been apparent since the mid-2010s. Turning Point USA (TPUS), now the most dominant conservative presence on US campuses, has clubs at more than 2500 college campuses. Charlie Kirk, its founder, also took over Students for Trump in 2019.

The Chronicle of Higher Education has documented groups such as the Groypers who have infiltrated conservative organizations on campus.

Student protests and clashes between left and right appeared on several US campuses in 2017. On August 11, 2017, white nationalists and members of the alt-right rallied at the University of Virginia, protesting the removal of a statue of Robert E. Lee. The following day, one person died during protests in Charlottesville. Following this event, speaking engagements by Richard Spencer were canceled at Texas A&M University and the University of Florida.

==== Dismantling the U.S. Department of Education ====
On March 20, 2025, President Donald Trump issued Executive order #14242 to dismantle the U.S. Department of Education to the extent allowed by law.

== Functions ==
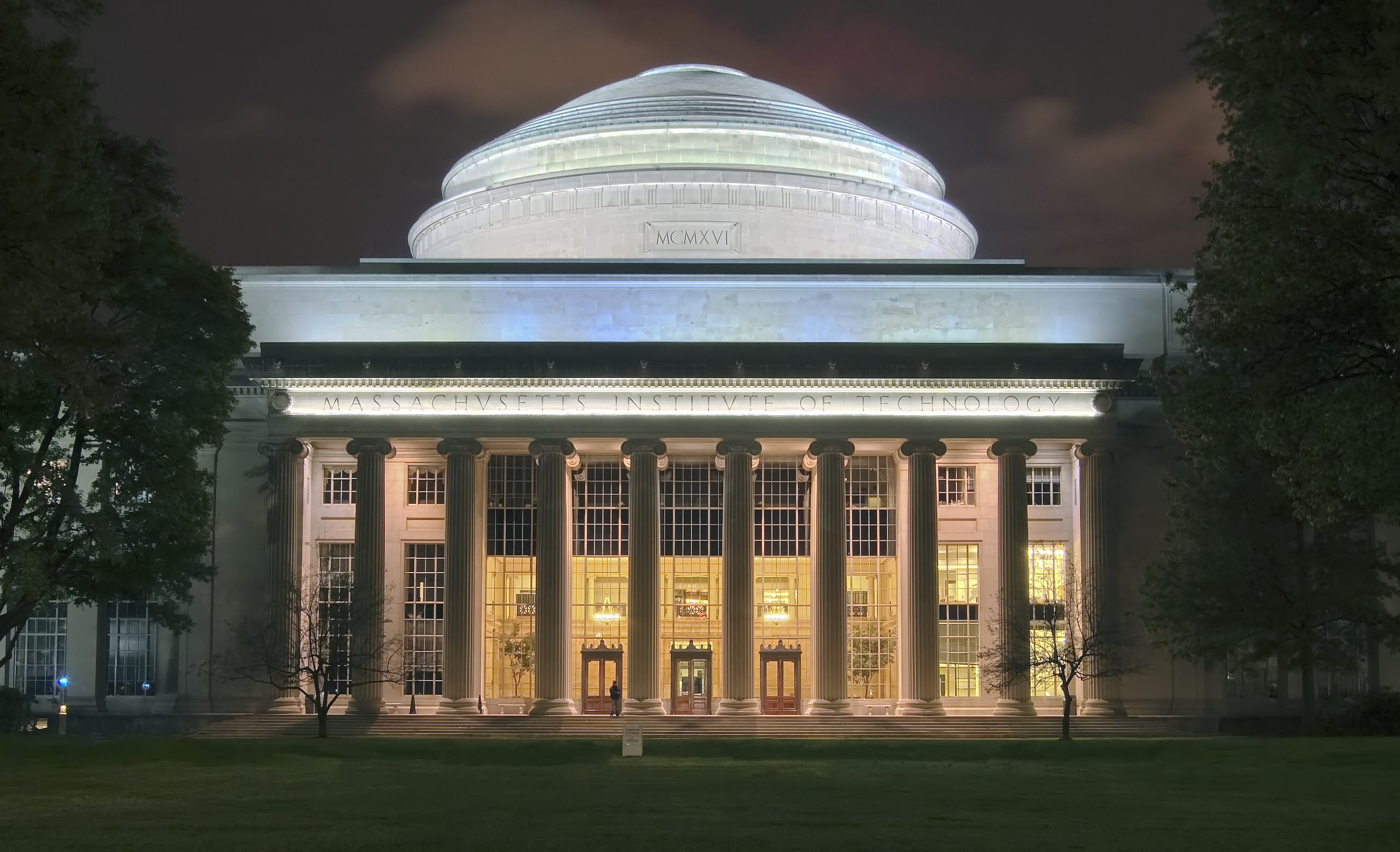
Massachusetts Institute of Technology (MIT), a polytechnic university in Cambridge, Massachusetts

U.S. higher education functions as an institution of knowledge but has several secondary functions. According to Marcus Ford, the primary function went through four phases in American history: preserving Christian civilization, advancing the national interest, research, and growing the global economy.

Higher education has also served as a source for professional credentials, as a vehicle for social mobility, and as a social sorter. The college functions as a 'status marker', "signaling membership in the educated class, and a place to meet spouses of similar status." Especially among students who move away from their families to attend residential four-year colleges, the experience of going away to college is seen as a rite of passage that produces young adults, irrespective of what they might learn in a classroom. The loss of these non-classroom experiences was the basis for some lawsuits filed after most campuses closed due to the COVID-19 pandemic. The desire for those experiences was also one reason why schools were pressured to re-open campus life in the fall of 2020.

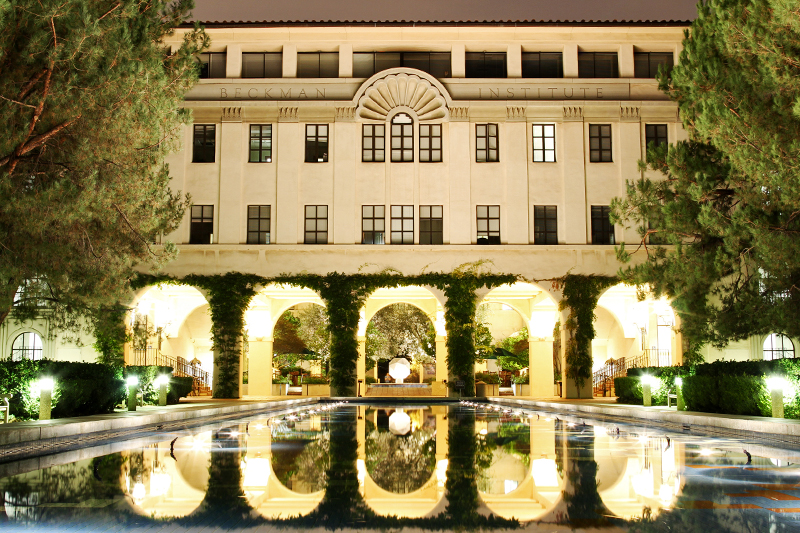
Caltech, a member of the Association of American Universities, and the antecedents of NASA's Jet Propulsion Laboratory, which Caltech continues to manage and operate

Many of the world's top universities, as ranked by mainly British and American ranking organizations, are in the United States. The U.S. also has the most Nobel Prize winners in history, with 403 (having won 406 awards). Strong research funding helped 'elite American universities' dominate global rankings in the early 21st century, making them attractive to international students, professors and researchers. Other countries, though, are offering incentives to compete for researchers as funding is threatened in the U.S. and U.S. dominance of international rankings has lessened.

U.S. higher education has also been blighted by fly-by-night schools, diploma mills, visa mills, and predatory for-profit colleges. There have been some attempts to reform it through federal policy such as gainful employment regulations and the Department of Education's College Scorecard, which publishes data on the socio-economic diversity, SAT/ACT scores, graduation rates, and average earnings and debt of graduates at all colleges.

As part of their administrative and governance functions, universities also receive internal legal guidance on compliance with federal antitrust law, particularly regarding coordination with peer institutions on hiring practices, compensation, information sharing, and collaborative purchasing or research activities.

According to Pew Research Center, public opinion about colleges has been declining, especially among Republicans. The higher education industry has been criticized for being unnecessarily expensive, providing a difficult-to-measure service which is seen as vital but in which providers are paid for inputs instead of outputs, which is beset with federal regulations that drive up costs, and payments coming from third parties, not users. In a 2018 Pew survey, 61 percent of those polled said that U.S. higher education was headed in the wrong direction. A 2019 Gallup survey found that, among graduates who strongly felt a purpose in life was important, "only 40 percent said they had found a meaningful career after college."

== Types of colleges and universities ==
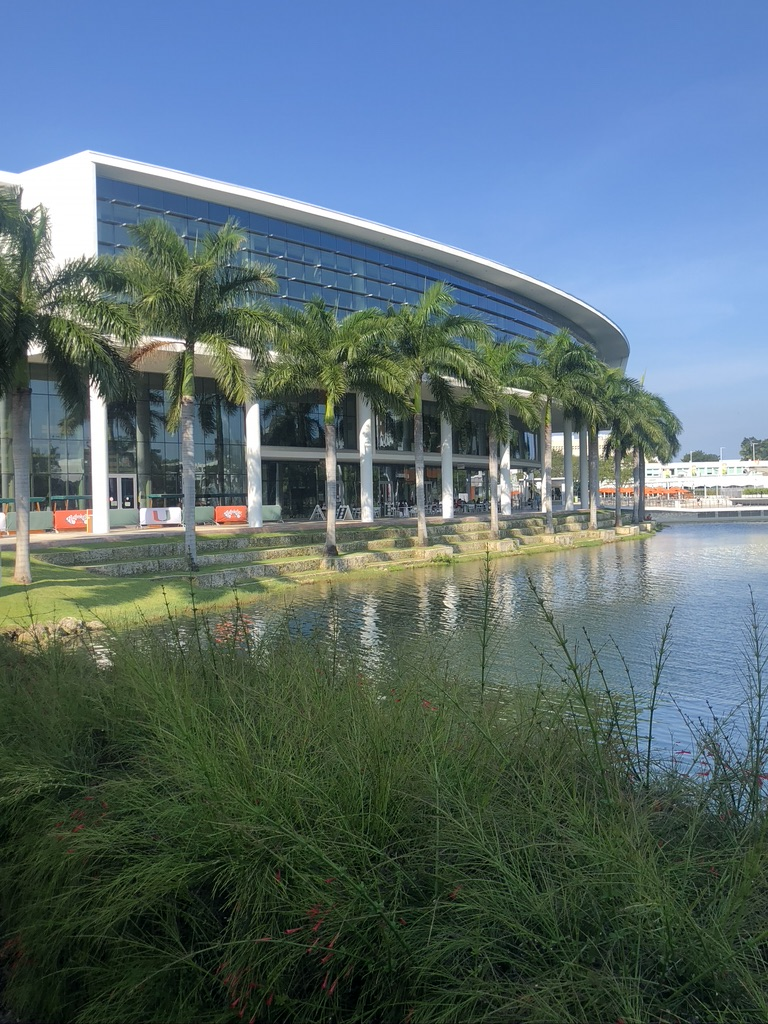
The University of Miami in Coral Gables, Florida

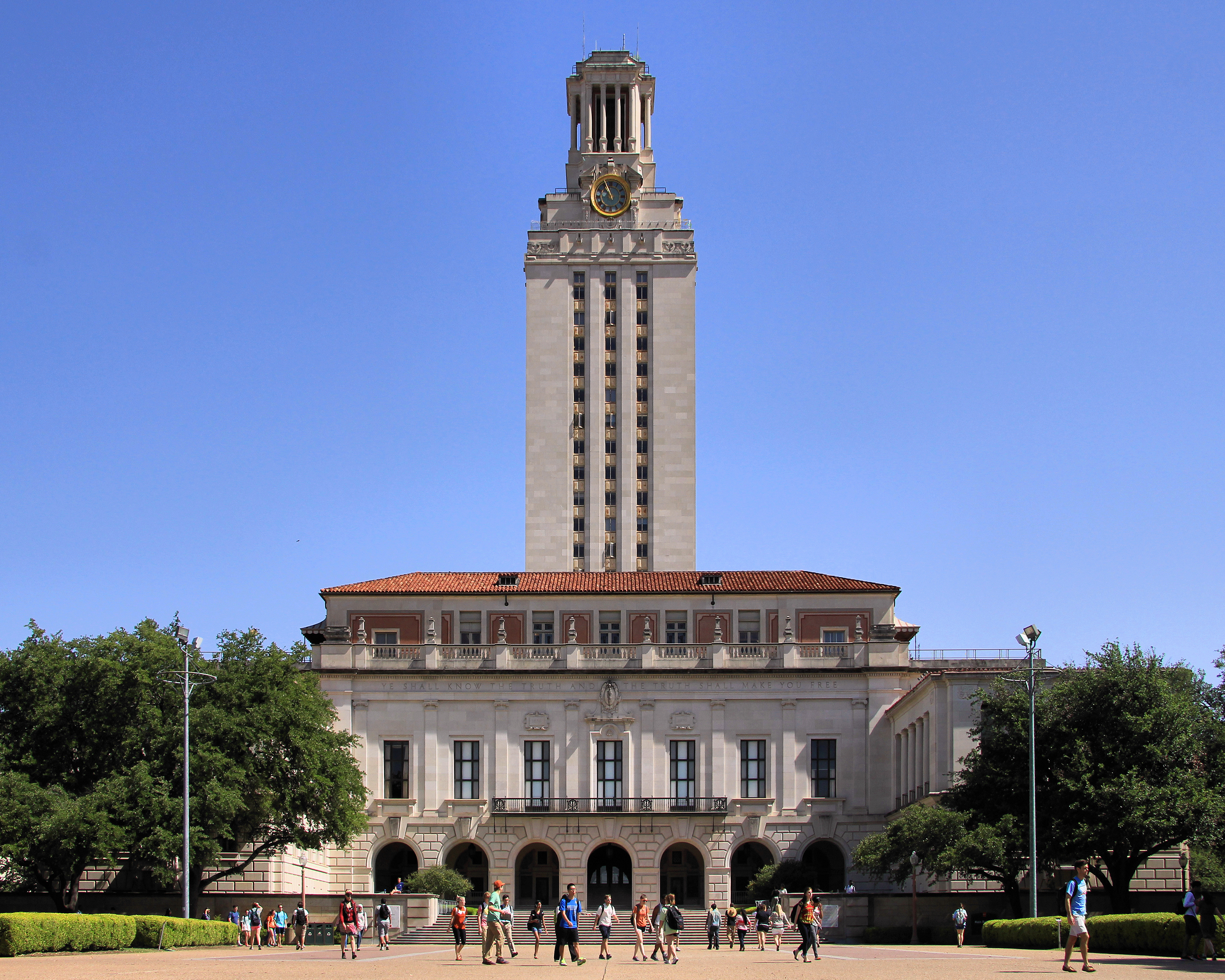
The Main Building at the University of Texas at Austin

U.S. colleges and universities offer diverse educational venues: some emphasize a vocational, business, engineering, or technical curriculum (like polytechnic universities and land-grant universities) and others emphasize a liberal arts curriculum. Many combine some or all of the above, as comprehensive universities.

The education and training that takes place in a university, college, or Institute of technology usually includes significant theoretical and abstract elements, as well as applied aspects (although limited offerings of internships or SURF programs attempt to provide practical applications). In contrast, the vocational higher education and training that takes place at vocational universities and schools usually concentrates on practical applications, with very little theory.

In the US, professional schools such as those for law, medicine, dentistry, and veterinary medicine are graduate schools which a student enters after completing a bachelor's degree. Despite teaching skills necessary for a specific profession and often ending in a licensing exam, these programs are not typically perceived as vocational schools. Admission to professional schools is often highly competitive and requires strong performance on standardized tests.

Employers hiring college graduates consider the average graduate to be more or less deficient in many skill areas, including critical thinking, analytical reasoning, team work, and communication skills.

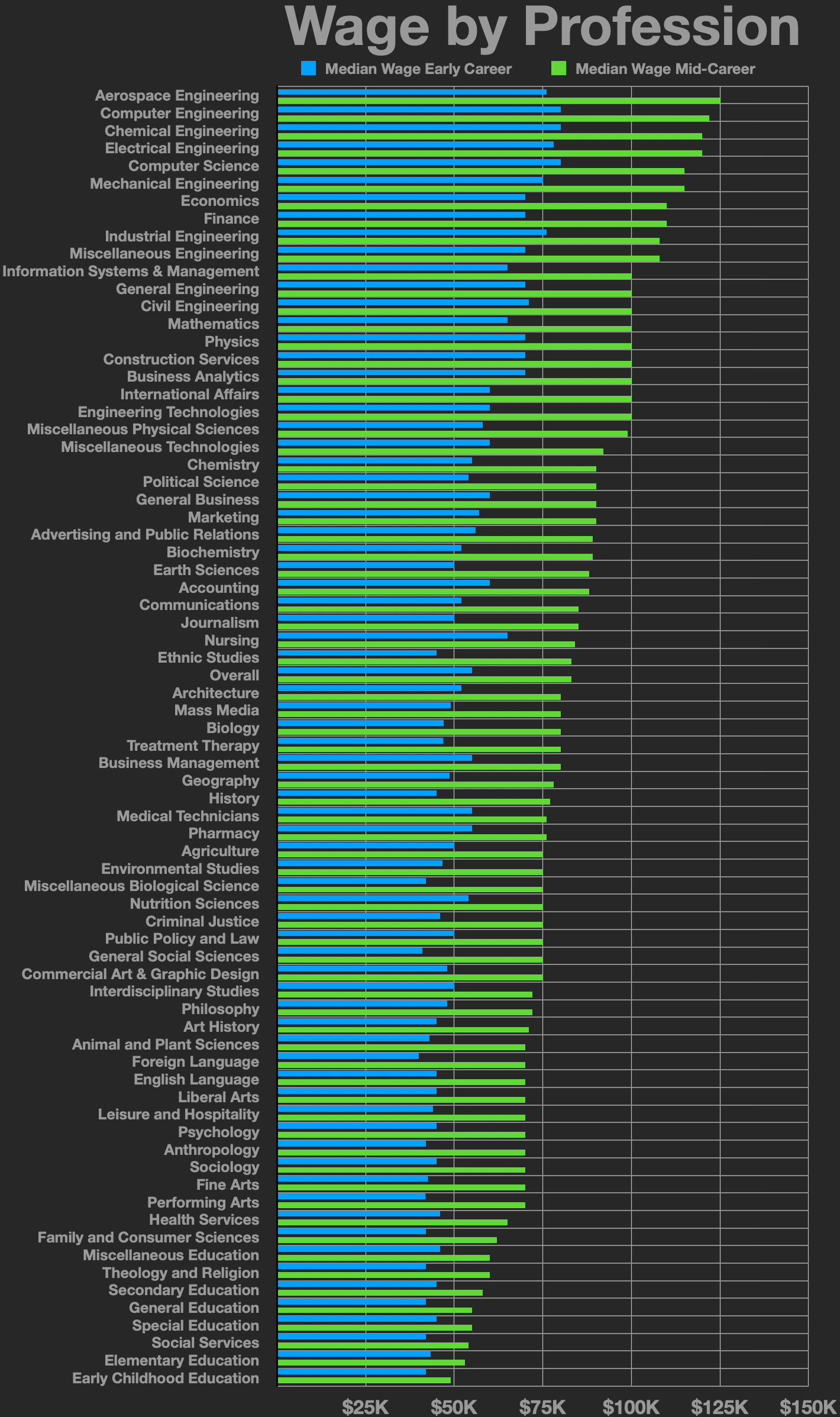
Wage by profession

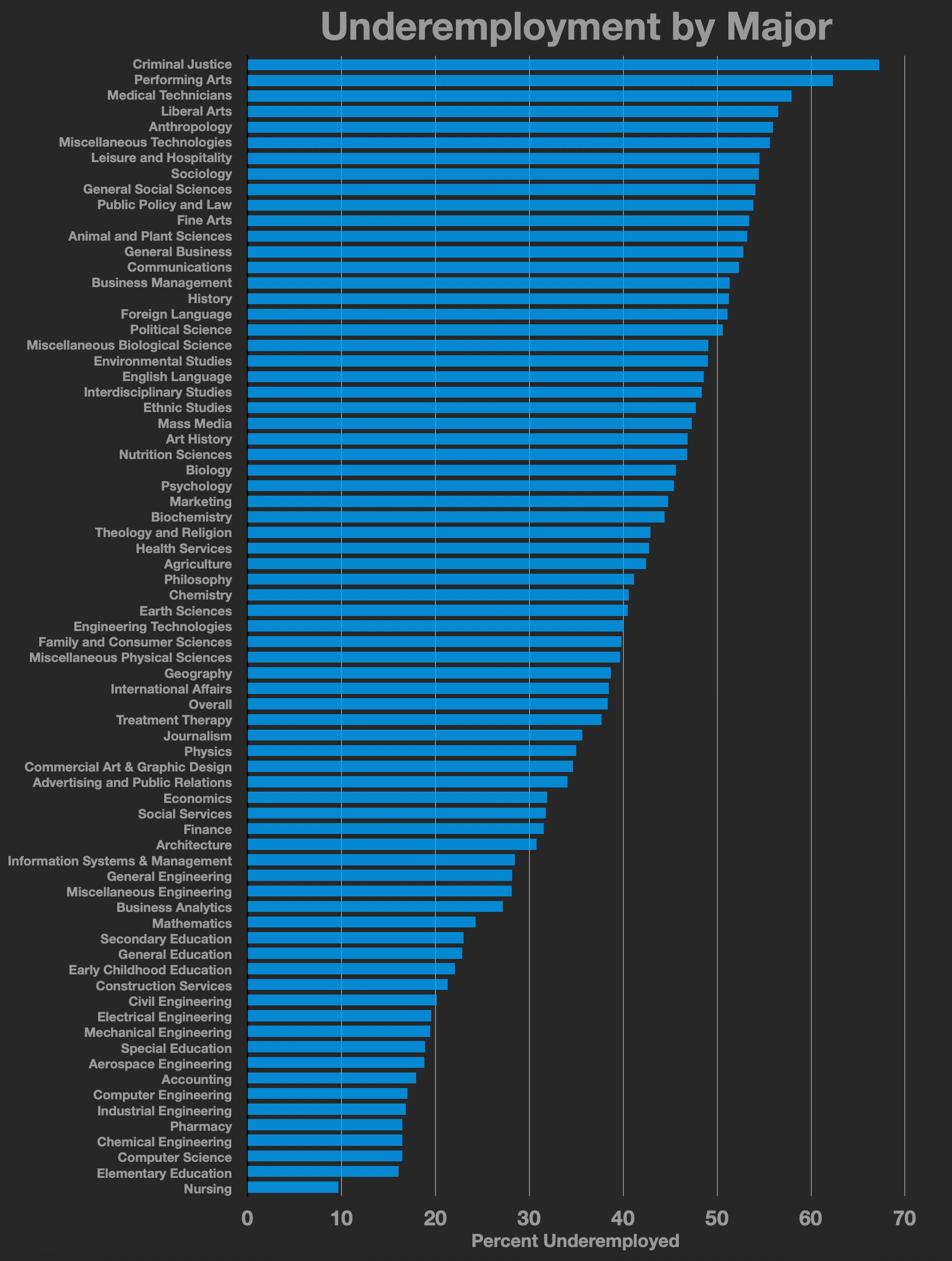
Underemployment by major

There are significant differences in the economic outcomes of different fields of study. Students with undergraduate degrees in the STEM fields, health, and business are generally the highest paid at the entry-level. According to the US Department of Education, education and nursing majors had the lowest average unemployment rates among 25–29 year old degree-holders, while English and computer science majors had some of the highest.

=== Terminology ===
The term "college" can refer to one of several key types of educational institutions:

1. Stand-alone higher-level education institutions that are not components of a university
2. Community colleges
3. Liberal arts colleges
4. Academic units within a larger university or educational institution

Almost all colleges and universities are coeducational. A dramatic transition occurred in the 1970s, when most men's colleges started to accept women. Over 80% of the women's colleges of the 1960s have closed or merged, leaving fewer than 50. Over 100 historically black colleges and universities (HBCUs) operate, both private and public.

Some US states offer higher education at two year "colleges" formerly called "community colleges". The change requires cooperation between community colleges and local universities.

Four-year colleges often provide the bachelor's degree, most commonly the Bachelor of Arts (B.A.) or Bachelor of Science (B.S.). They are primarily either undergraduate only institutions (e.g. liberal arts colleges), or the undergraduate institution of a university (such as Harvard College, Yale College, and Columbia College).

Higher education has led to the creation of accreditation organizations, independent of the government, to vouch for the quality of degrees. These voluntary member organizations establish and maintain standards at participating institutions. Accrediting agencies have been criticized for possible conflicts of interest that lead to favorable results. Non-accredited institutions exist, but their students are not eligible for federal loans.

=== Universities ===
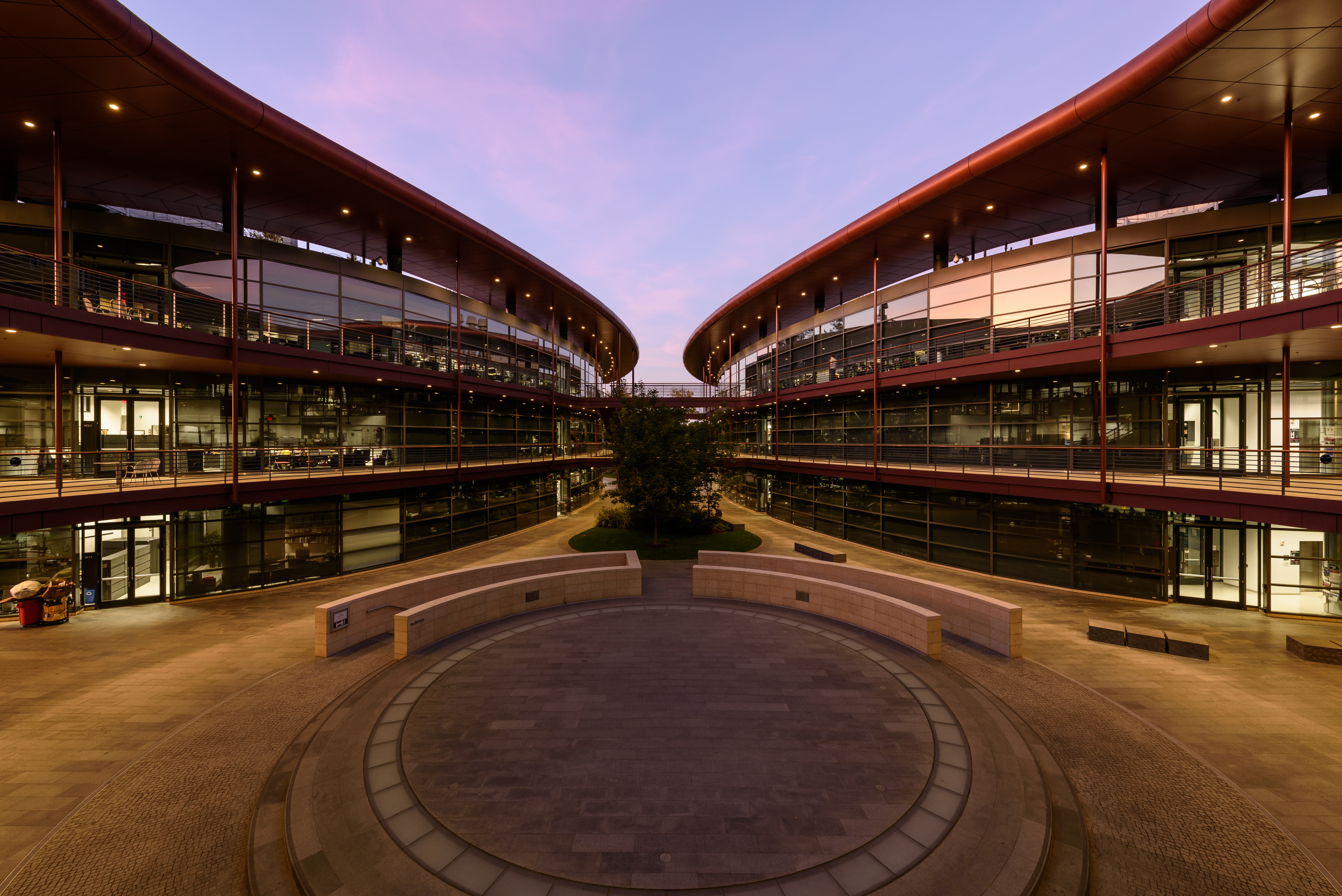
The James H. Clark Center at Stanford University in Stanford, California

Universities are educational institutions with undergraduate and graduate programs. For historical or cultural reasons, some universities have retained the term college instead of "university" for their name. Graduate programs grant a variety of master's degrees (like the Master of Arts (M.A.), Master of Science (M.S.), Master of Business Administration (M.B.A.) or Master of Fine Arts (M.F.A.)) in addition to doctorates such as the Ph.D. The Carnegie Classification of Institutions of Higher Education distinguishes among institutions on the basis of the prevalence of degrees they grant and considers the granting of master's degrees necessary, although not sufficient, for an institution to be classified as a university.

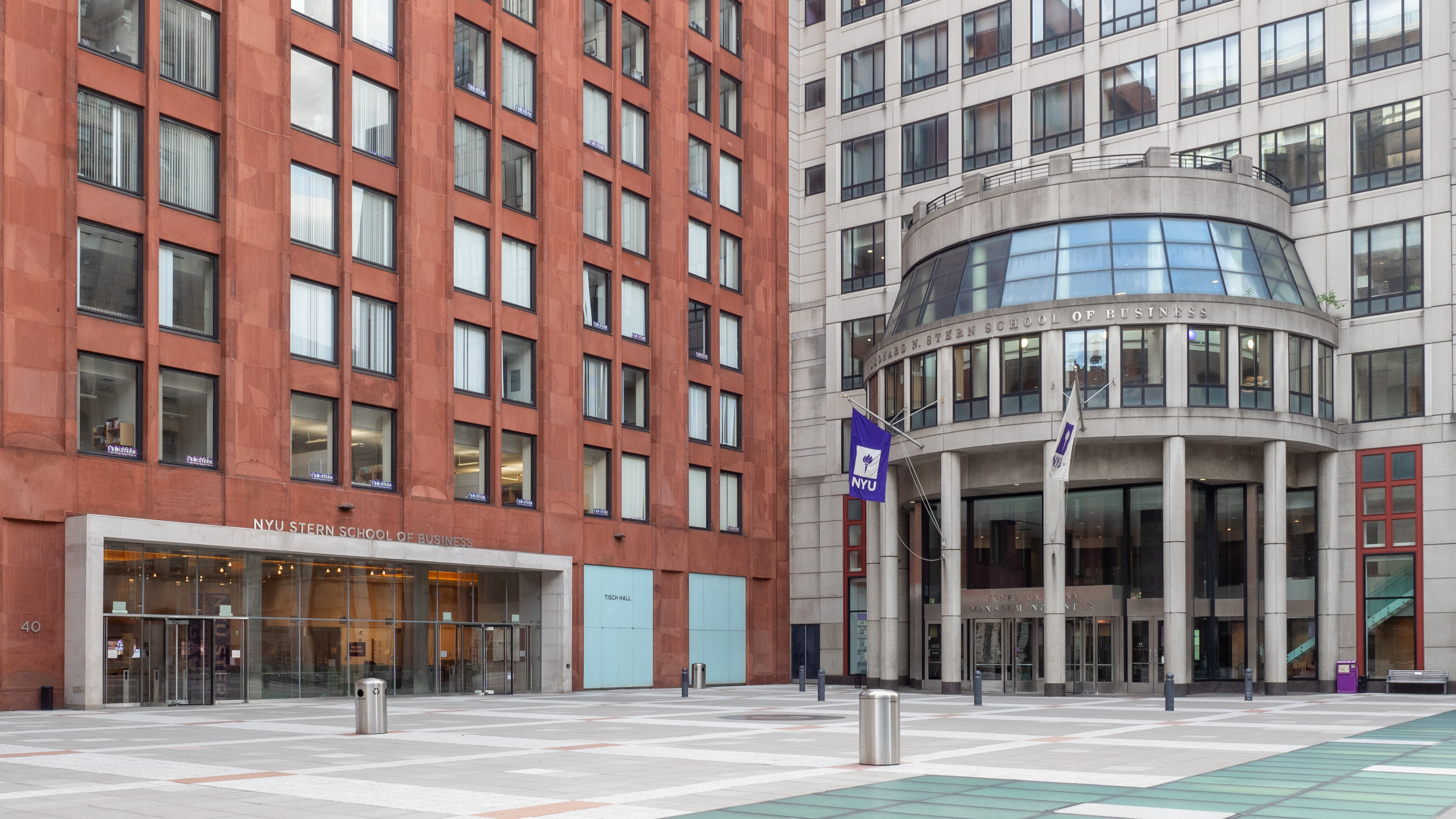
Stern School of Business, the business school of New York University in New York City

Some universities have professional schools. Examples include journalism school, business school, medical schools, pharmacy schools (Pharm.D.), and dental schools. A common practice is to refer to these disparate faculties within universities as colleges or schools.

As a whole, American universities are largely decentralized. Public universities are administered by the individual states and territories, usually as part of a state university system. Except for the United States service academies and staff colleges, the federal government does not directly regulate universities. However, it can offer federal grants and any institution that receives federal funds must certify that it has adopted and implemented a drug prevention program that meets federal regulations.

Some American universities have recently begun offering apprenticeship degrees. For instance, in Fall 2023, Talent Together Michigan established its position as a statewide intermediary for teaching apprenticeships in partnership with 13 in-state universities and colleges.

Each state supports at least one state university and many support several. At one extreme, California has three public higher education systems: the 10-campus University of California, the 23-campus California State University, and the 112-campus California Community Colleges System. In contrast, Wyoming supports a single state university. Public universities often have large student bodies, with introductory classes numbering in the hundreds, with some undergraduate classes taught by graduate students. Tribal colleges operated on Indian reservations by some federally recognized tribes are also public institutions.

Many private universities exist. Some are secular and others are involved in religious education. Some are non-denominational, and some are affiliated with a certain sect or church, such as Roman Catholicism (with different institutions often sponsored by particular religious institutes such as the Jesuits) or religions such as Lutheranism or Mormonism. Seminaries are private institutions for those preparing to become members of the clergy. Most private schools (like all public schools) are non-profit, although some are for-profit.

=== Liberal arts colleges ===
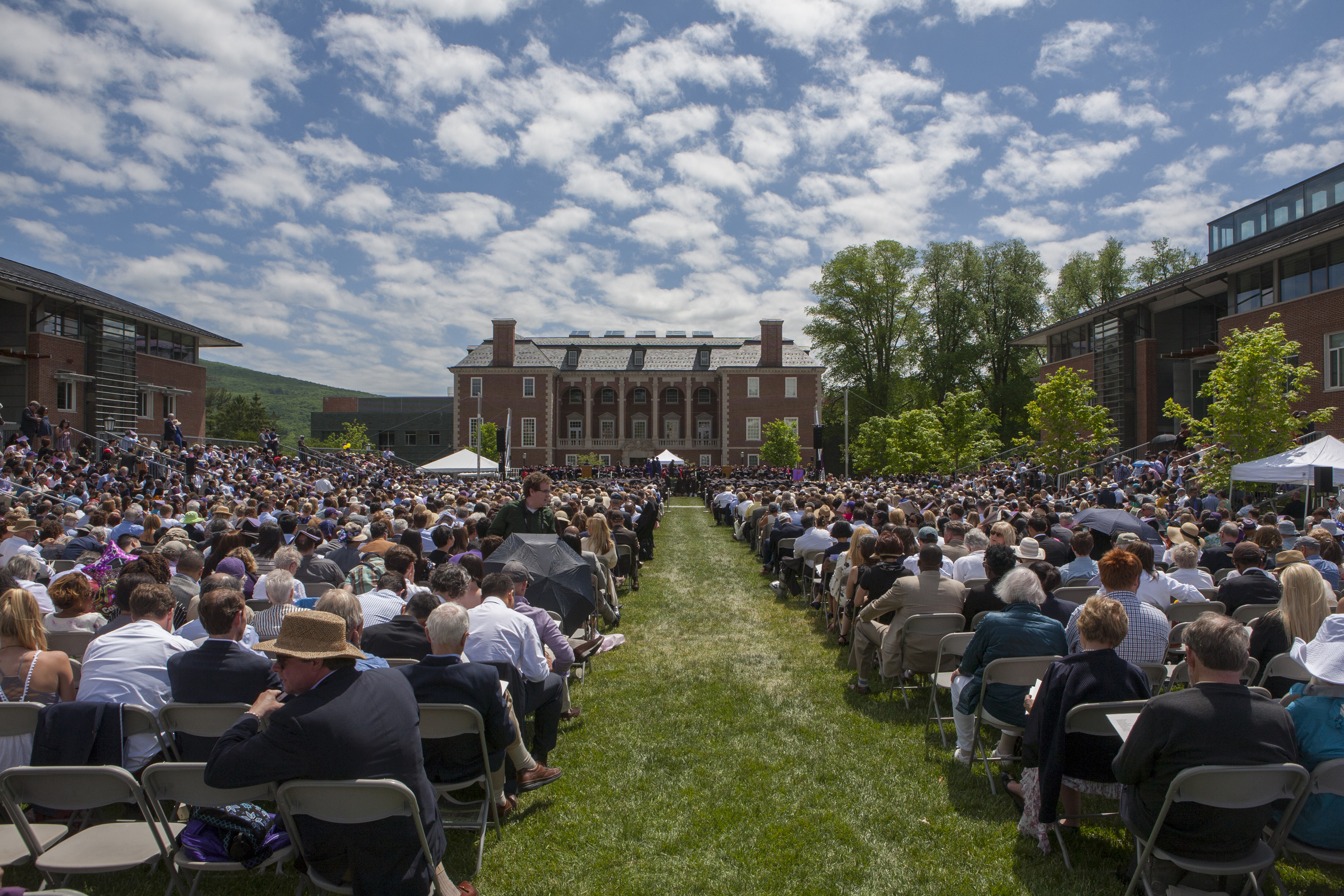
Commencement at Williams College, a private liberal arts college in Williamstown, Massachusetts

Four-year institutions emphasizing the liberal arts are liberal arts colleges. They traditionally emphasize interactive instruction. They are known for being residential and for having smaller enrollment and lower student-to-faculty ratios than universities. Most are private, although there are public liberal arts colleges. Some offer experimental curricula. Academic areas that are included within the liberal arts include great books, history, languages including English, linguistics, literature, mathematics, music, philosophy, political science, psychology, religious studies, science, environmental science, sociology and theater.

=== Community colleges ===
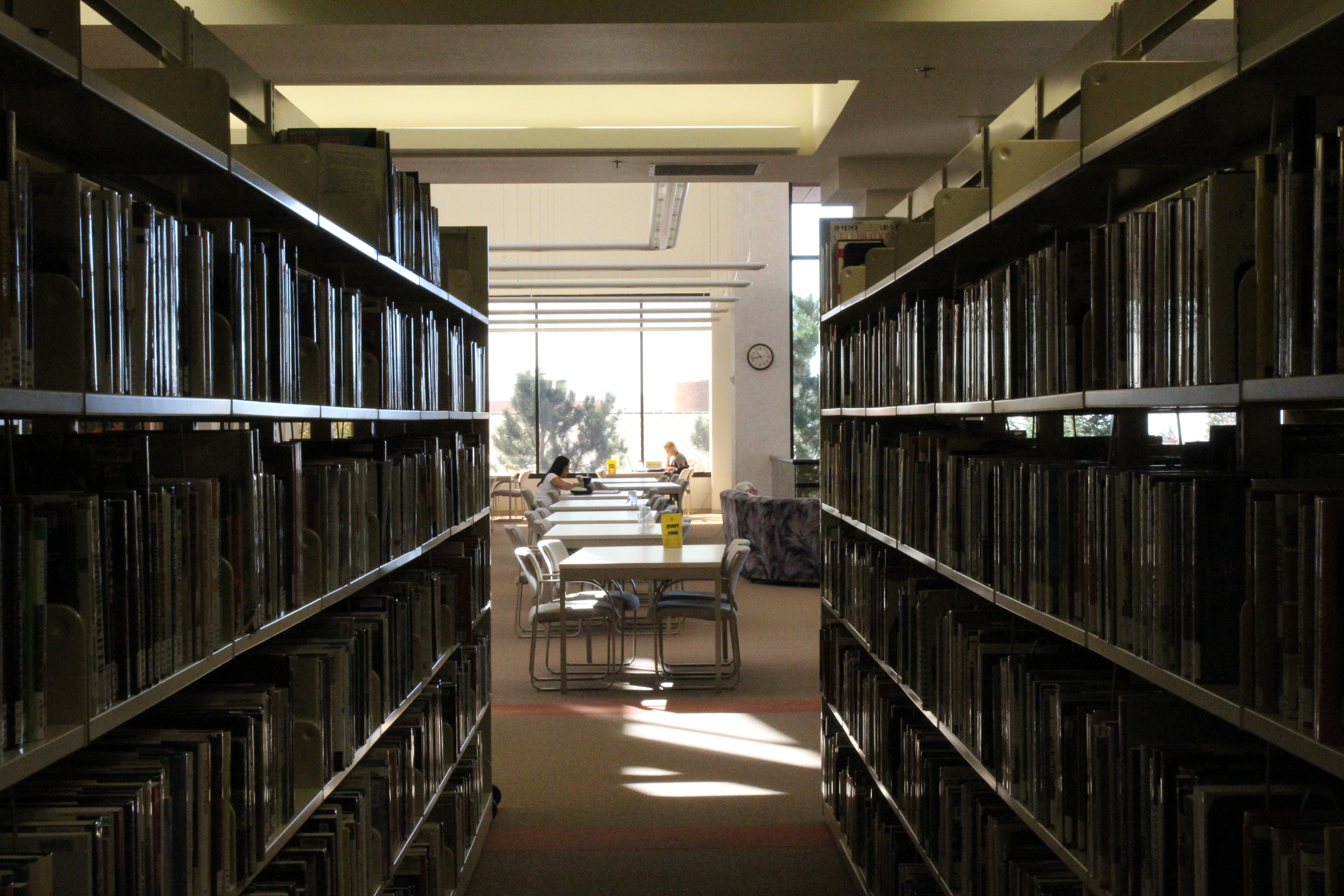
Truckee Meadows Community College in Reno, Nevada

Community colleges are often two-year colleges. They have open admissions, usually with lower tuition fees than other state or private schools. Graduates earn associate degrees, such as an Associate of Arts (AA). More recently, apprenticeship degrees are being offered at some community colleges.

According to National Student Clearinghouse data, community college enrollment has dropped by 2.2 million students since its peak year of 2010–11. In 2017, 88% of community colleges surveyed were facing declining enrollments. A New York Times report in 2017 suggested that of the nation's 18 million undergraduates, 40% were attending community college; of these students, 62% were attending community college full-time, 40% of them worked at least 30 hours a week or more, and more than half lived at home to save money.

The College Promise program, which exists in several forms in 47 states, is an effort to encourage community college enrollment.

=== For-profit colleges ===
For-profit higher education (known as for-profit college or proprietary education) refers to higher education institutions operated by private, profit-seeking businesses. Students were "attracted to the programs for their ease of enrollment and help obtaining financial aid," but "disappointed with the poor quality of education...." University of Phoenix has been the largest for-profit college in the US. Since 2010, for-profit colleges have received greater scrutiny from the US government, state Attorneys General, the media, and scholars. Notable business failures include Corinthian Colleges (2015), ITT Educational Services (2016), Education Management Corporation (2017), and Education Corporation of America (2018). Two large schools, Kaplan University and Ashford University were sold to public universities with for-profit online program managers and rebranded as Purdue University Global and University of Arizona Global Campus.

=== Engineering ===
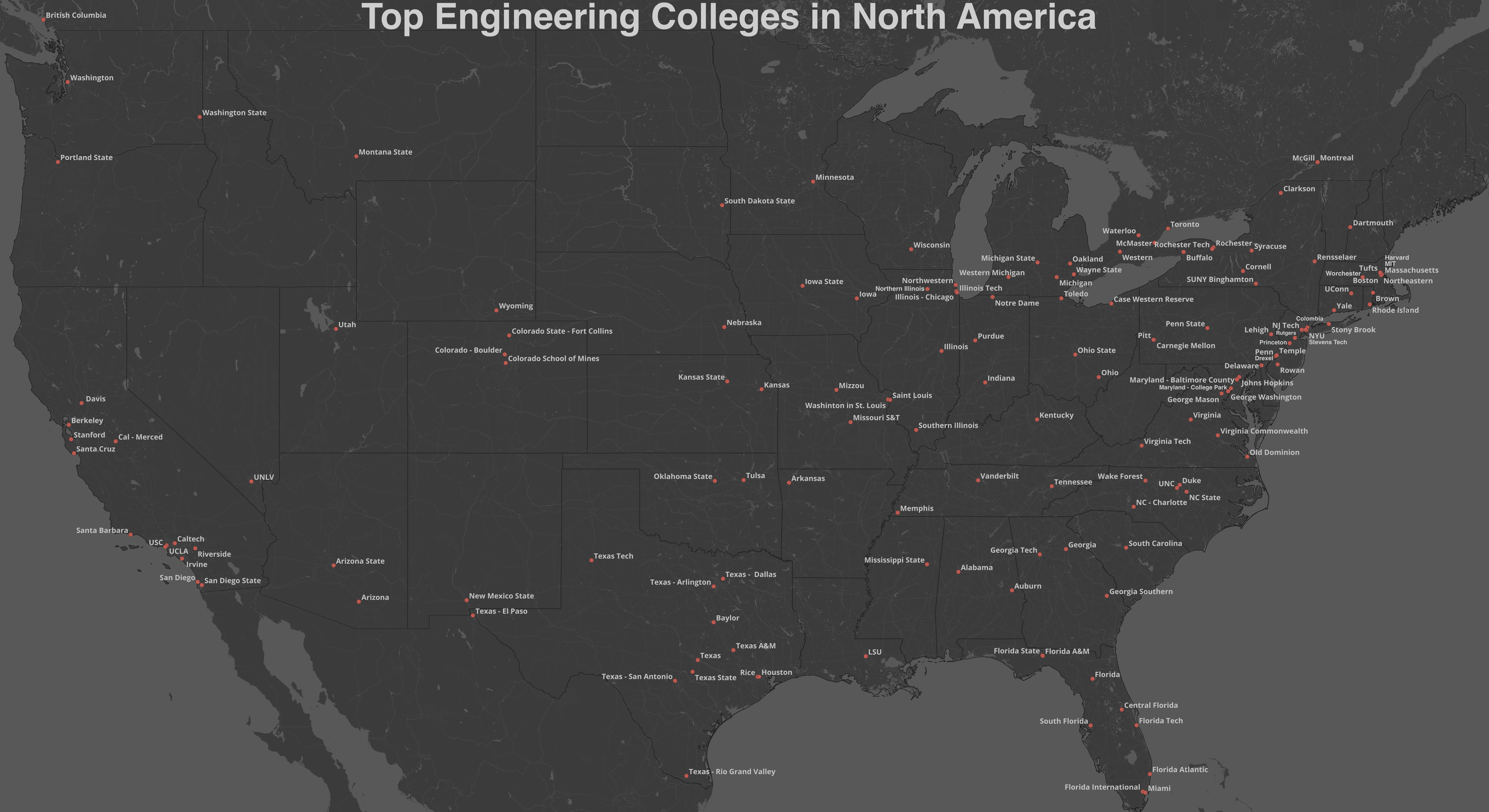
Top engineering colleges in North America

Teaching engineering is teaching the application of scientific, economic, social, and practical knowledge in order to design, build, maintain, and improve structures, machines, devices, systems, materials and processes. It may encompass using insights to conceive, model and scale an appropriate solution to a problem or objective. The discipline of engineering is extremely broad, and encompasses a range of more specialized fields of engineering, each with a more specific emphasis on particular areas of technology and types of application. Engineering disciplines include aerospace, biological, civil, chemical, computer, electrical, industrial and mechanical.

=== Performing arts ===
The performing arts differ from the plastic arts or visual arts, insofar as the former uses the artist's own body, face and presence as a medium; the latter uses materials such as clay, metal or paint, which can be molded or transformed to create a work of art.

Performing arts institutions include circus schools, dance schools, drama schools and music schools.

=== Plastic or visual arts ===
The plastic arts or visual arts are a class of art forms, that involve the use of materials, that can be moulded or modulated in some way, often in three dimensions. Examples are painting, sculpture, and drawing.

Higher educational institutions in these arts include film schools and art schools.

=== Vocational ===
Higher vocational education and training takes place at the non-university tertiary level. Such education combines teaching of both practical skills and theoretical expertise. Higher education differs from other forms of post-secondary education such as that offered by institutions of vocational education, which are more colloquially known as trade schools. Higher vocational education might be contrasted with education in a usually broader scientific field, which might concentrate on theory and abstract conceptual knowledge.

=== Professional higher education ===
Professional higher education describes a distinct form of higher education that offers an integration with the world of work in all its aspects (including teaching, learning, research and governance) and at all levels of the overarching Qualifications Framework of the European Higher Education Area. Its function is to diversify learning opportunities, enhance employability, offer qualifications and stimulate innovation.

The intensity of integration with the world of work (which includes enterprise, civil society and the public sector) is manifested by a strong focus on application of learning. This approach involves combining phases of work and study, a concern for employability, cooperation with employers, the use of practice-relevant knowledge and use-inspired research.

Examples of providers of professional higher education include graduate colleges of architecture, business, journalism, law, library science, optometry, pharmacy, public policy, human medicine, professional engineering, podiatric medicine, scientific dentistry, K-12 education, and veterinary medicine.

== Funding of universities and colleges ==
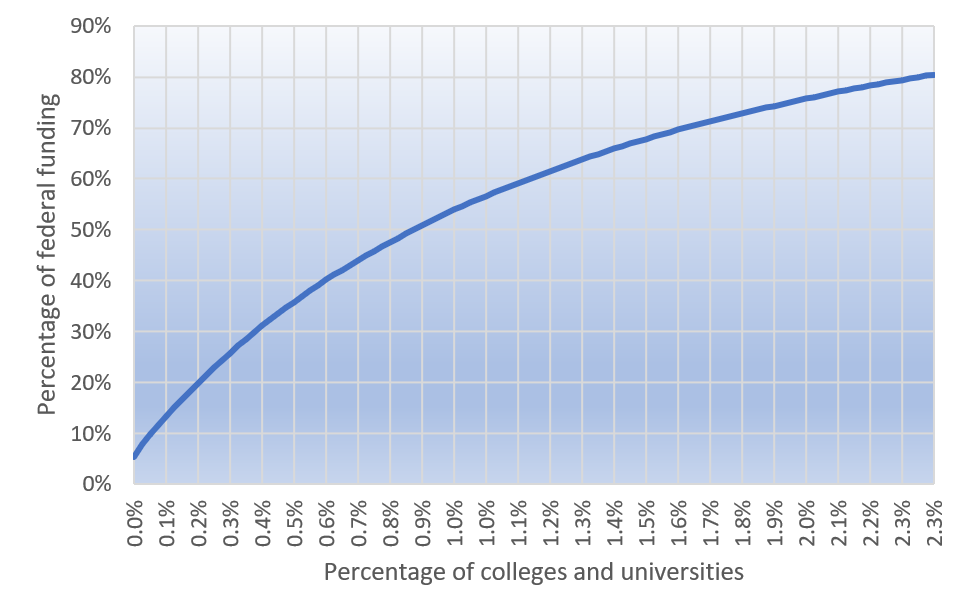
In 2017, the federal contribution amounted to 40 billion dollars. Only 100 schools out of more than 4,000 received 80% of that sum.

=== Sources and oversight of funds ===
US colleges and universities receive their funds from many sources, including tuition, federal Title IV funds, state funds, and endowments.

The US Department of Education can delay or stop funding if an institution shows financial instability. One of the mechanisms is called heightened cash monitoring.

==== Heightened cash monitoring ====
Heightened Cash Monitoring is a special administrative status employed by the United States Department of Education to watch more closely over educational institutions such as colleges and universities that have been identified as requiring additional attention from the Department, due to some unusual financial event or history at the institution in connection with its management of student financial aid funds disbursed by the Department's Federal Student Aid office.

For the purposes of receiving reimbursements for student aid, educational institutions in good standing normally interact with the Department of Education under a regime called the Advance Payment Method. For others which are not in good standing, the Department may assign one of two levels of monitoring, called HCM1 ("Heightened Cash Monitoring 1") and HCM2. The less restrictive of the two is HCM1, and involves a certain amount of additional paperwork by the institution and increased monitoring by the Department of Education, the goal being to avoid problems before they occur, and to prevent the institution from ending up on level two. HCM2 is a considerably more onerous level of monitoring than level one. In HCM2, the school must submit a request to the Department every time along with student financial aid documentation, before funds can be issued. Each request is examined at the Department, before any funds are released.

==== State government ====
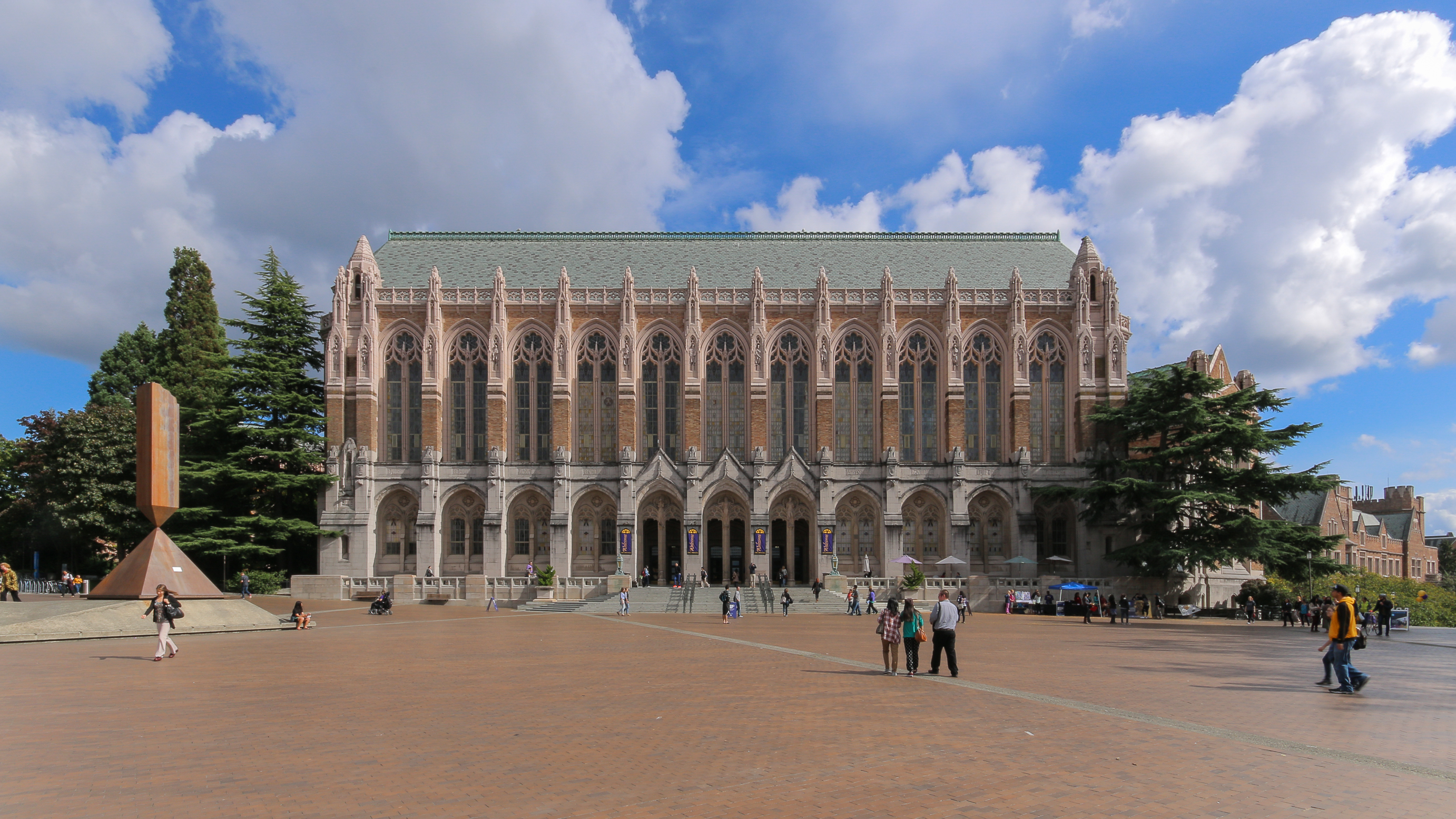
Suzzallo Library at the University of Washington in Seattle

The major source of funding for public institutions of higher education is direct support from the state. The levels of state support roughly correlate with the population of the state. For example, with a population nearly 40 million, the state of California allocates more than $15 billion on higher education. At the other extreme, Wyoming allocates $384 million for its 570,000 citizens. State funding for higher education decreased significantly following the Great Recession. According to the Center on Budget and Policy Priorities, the average state spent "16 percent, less per student in 2017 than in 2008" and in 8 states (Alabama, Arizona, Illinois, Louisiana, New Mexico, Oklahoma, Pennsylvania, and South Carolina) funding fell by more than 30 percent over the same time.

==== Institutional donors and endowments ====
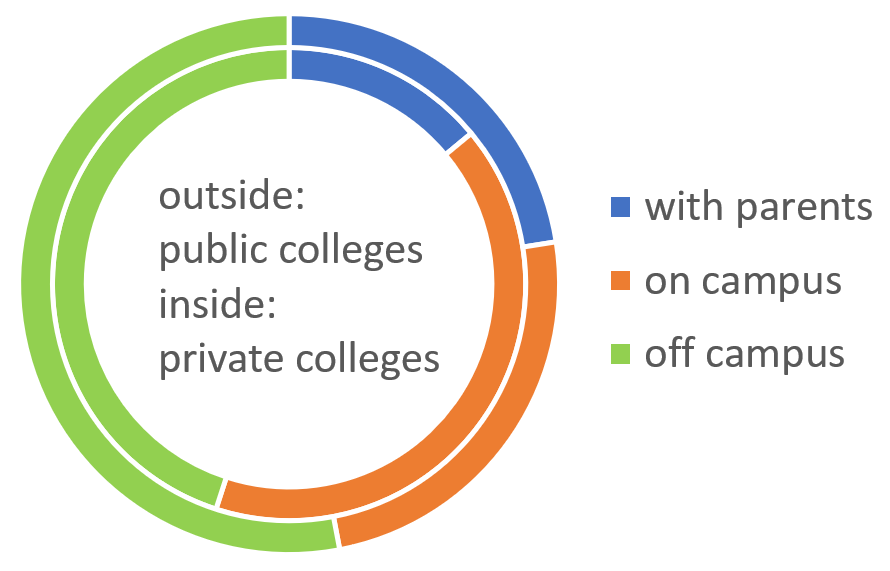
4-year colleges and universities in 2015–2016

Private giving supports both private and public institutions. Gifts come in two forms, current use and endowment. Both types of gifts are usually constrained according to a contract between the donor and the institution. Private institutions tend to be more reliant on private giving.

Universities with some of the largest endowments include:

- Harvard University $40.9 billion
- University of Texas $30.88 billion
- Princeton University $25.9 billion

Private philanthropy can be controversial. At the University of Maryland, Northrop Grumman has funded a cybersecurity concentration, designs the curriculum in cybersecurity, provides computers and pays some cost of a new dorm. At Ohio State, IBM partnered to teach big data analytics. Murray State University's engineering program was supported by computer companies. The College of Nanoscale Science and Engineering at State University of New York in Albany, received billions of dollars in private sector investment.

=== Student costs and funding ===
The inflation-adjusted cost of U.S. higher education has more than doubled in fifty years.

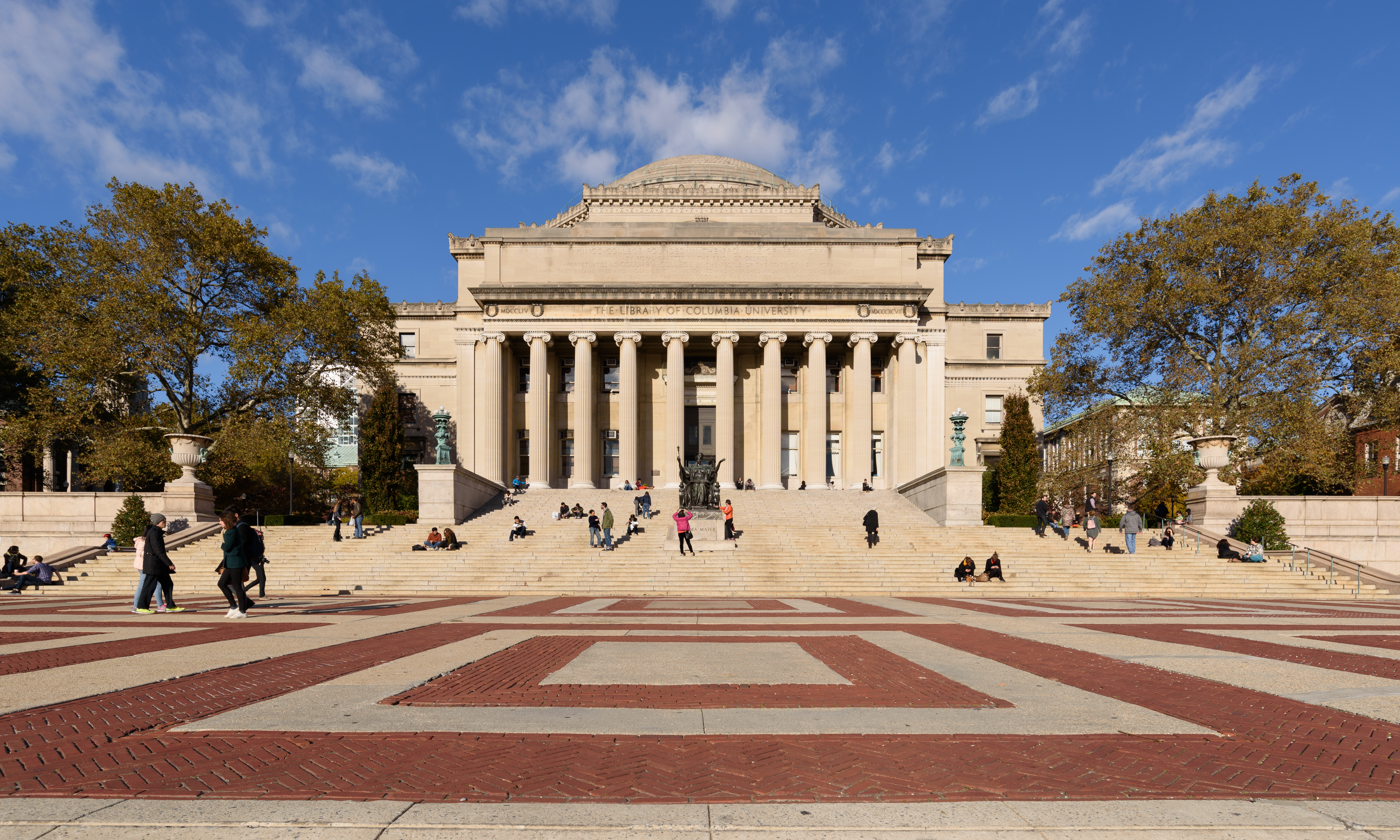
In 2019, Columbia University, an Ivy League university in New York City, charged $62,000 in tuition, making it the most expensive undergraduate school in the nation.

In 2016, average estimated annual student costs (excluding books) were $16,757 at public institutions, $43,065 at private nonprofit institutions, and $23,776 at private for-profit institutions. Between 2006 and 2016, prices at public colleges and universities rose 34 percent above inflation, and prices at private nonprofit institutions rose 26 percent above inflation. According to the American Association of State Colleges and Universities at public universities, "the percentage of educational revenues supported by tuition, measured in constant dollars, has risen from 23 percent in 1987 to 47 percent in 2012".

Students receive scholarships, student loans, or grants to offset costs out-of-pocket. Several states offer scholarships that allow students to attend free of tuition or at lower cost, for example the HOPE Scholarship in Georgia and the Bright Futures Scholarship Program in Florida. Some private colleges and universities offer full need-based financial aid, so that admitted students only have to pay as much as their families can afford (based on the university's assessment of their income). In most cases, the barrier of entry for students who require financial aid is set higher, a practice called need-aware admissions. Universities with exceptionally large endowments may combine need-based financial aid with need-blind admission, in which students who require financial aid have equal chances to those who do not.

Financial assistance comes in two major forms: grant programs and loan programs. Grant programs consist of money the student receives to pay for higher education that does not need to be paid back; loan programs consist of money the student receives to pay for school that must be paid back. Public higher education institutions (which are partially funded through state government appropriation) and private higher education institutions (which are funded exclusively through tuition and private donations) offer grant and loan financial assistance programs. Grants to attend public schools are distributed through federal and state governments, and through the schools themselves; grants to attend private schools are distributed through the school itself (independent organizations, such as charities or corporations also offer grants that can be applied to both public and private higher education institutions). Loans can be obtained publicly through government sponsored loan programs or privately through independent lending institutions.

Financial aid at US institutions has shifted from needs based to merit based, leaving many low-income students with more debt and fewer opportunities.

==== Grants, scholarships, loans and work study programs ====
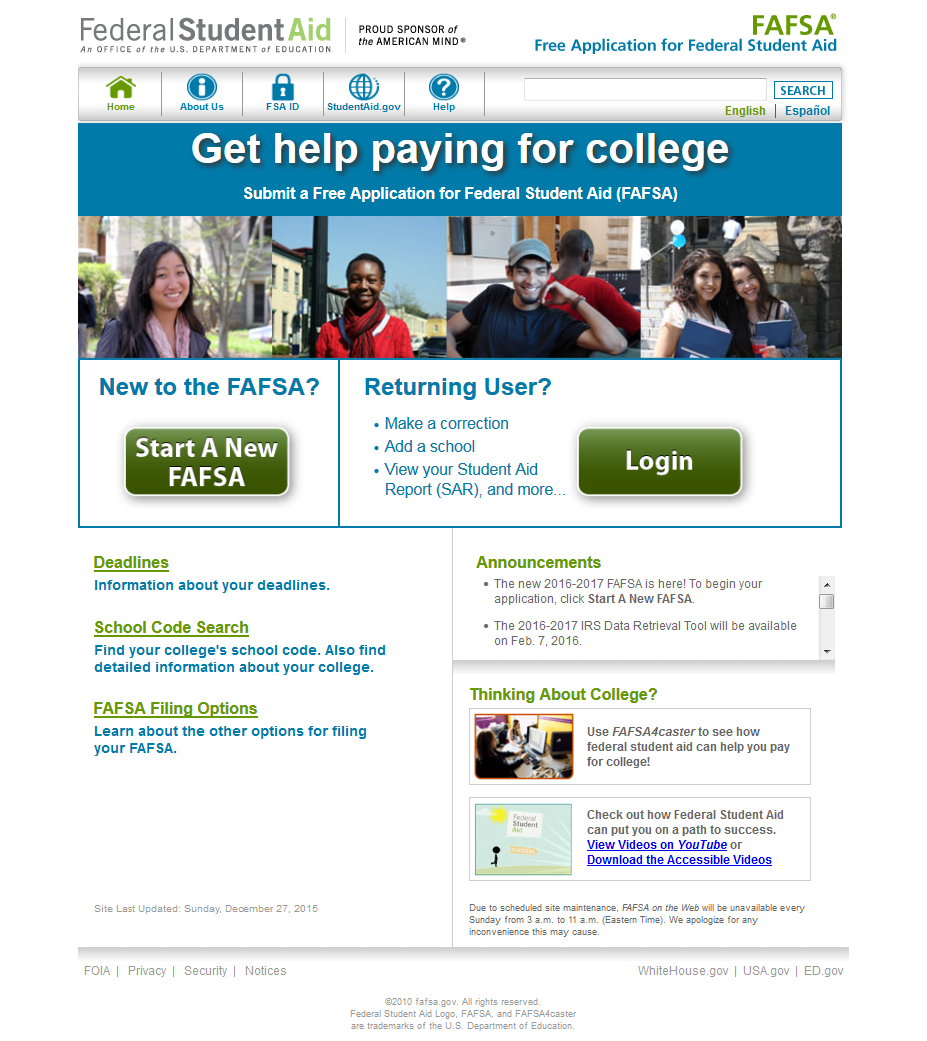
The website of the Free Application for Federal Student Aid, which allows American students to determine their eligibility for student financial aid

Grant programs and work study programs are divided into two major categories: Need-based financial awards and merit-based financial awards. Most state governments provide need-based scholarship programs, while a few also offer merit-based aid. Several need-based grants are provided through the federal government based on information provided on a student's Free Application for Federal Student Aid or FAFSA. The federal Pell Grant is a need-based grant available from the federal government. The federal government had two other grants that were a combination of need-based and merit-based: the Academic Competitiveness Grant, and the National SMART Grant, but the SMART grant was abolished in 2011 with the last grant awarded in June 2011. In order to receive one of these grants a student must be eligible for the Pell Grant, meet specific academic requirements, and be a US citizen.

Eligibility for work study programs is also determined by information collected on the student's FAFSA.

Many companies offer tuition reimbursement plans for their employees, to make benefits package more attractive, to upgrade the skill levels and to increase retention.

In 2012, total student loans exceeded consumer credit card debt for the first time in history. In late 2016, the total estimated US student loan debt exceeded $1.4 trillion.

Student loans can be divided into two categories: federal student loans and private student loans. Federal student loans may be:

- subsidized Stafford Loans
- unsubsidized Stafford Loans
- Direct Loans
- PLUS Loans

A student's eligibility for any of these loans, as well as the amount of the loan itself is determined by information on the student's FAFSA. The former Federal Perkins Loan program expired in 2017.

== Statistics ==
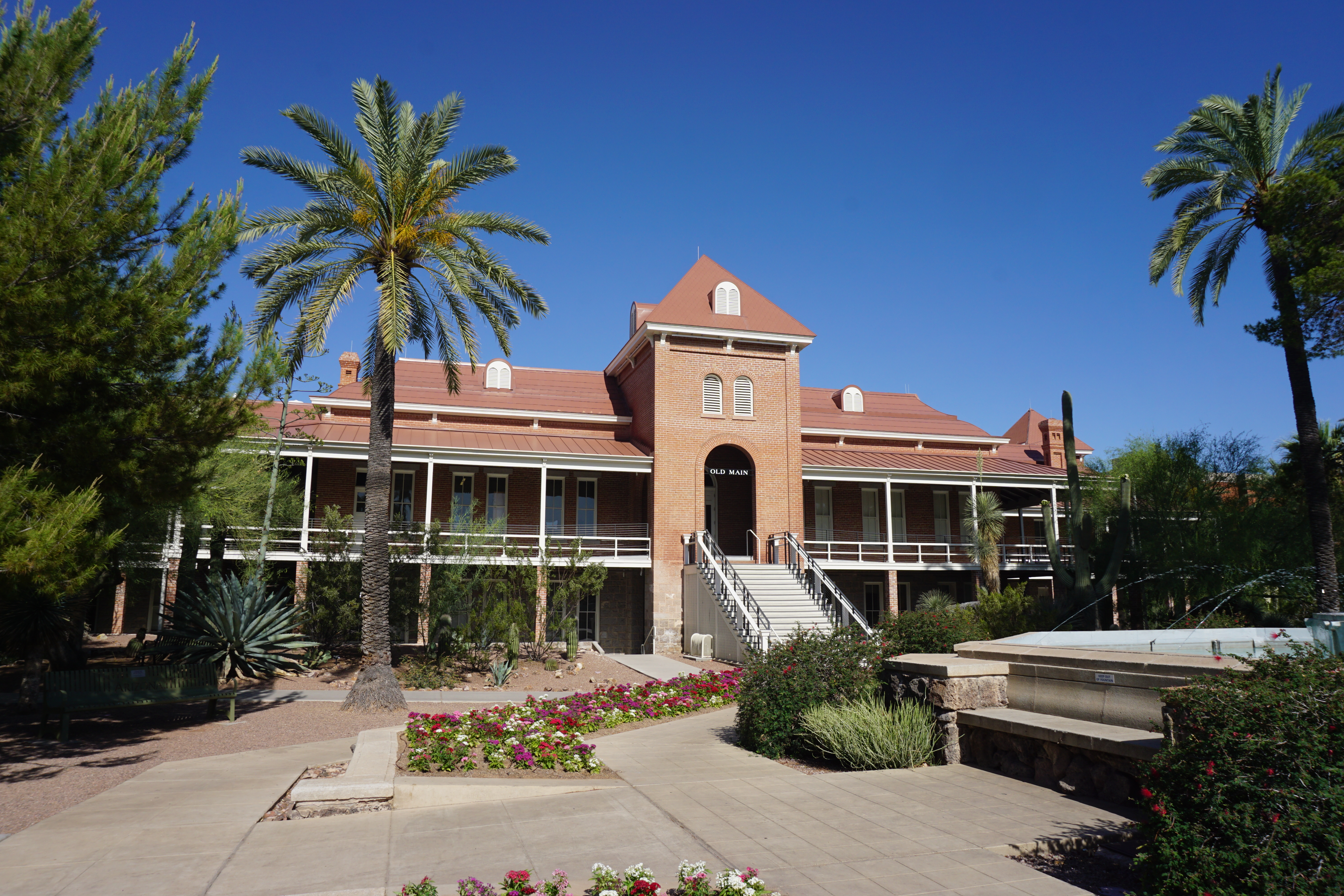
University of Arizona, a public land-grant research university in Tucson, Arizona

US educational statistics are provided by the National Center for Education Statistics (NCES), part of the Department of Education. The number of Title IV-eligible, degree-granting institutions peaked at 4,726 in 2012, with 4-year institutions numbering at 3,026 and 2-year institutions at 1,700. Enrollment at postsecondary institutions, participating in Title IV, peaked at just over 21 million students in 2010. Demographic wise, on average, whites constitute the highest percentage of enrollments in US higher educational institutions. The National Center for Education Statistics (NCES) and the National Student Clearinghouse show that college enrollment has declined since a peak in 2010–11, and is projected to continue declining or be stagnant for the next two decades.

Enrollment data for postsecondary education in degree-granting institutions in US
Year	Fall enrollment				Degree-granting institutions			Ethnic demography of students(%)				
Year	(total)	(male)	(female)	(percent female)	(Total)	(4-year)	(2-year)	(white)	(black)	(Hispanic)	(Asian/pacific islander)	(others)
2022	18,580,026	7,814,536	10,765,490	57.9	3,896	2,628	1,268	52.3	13.2	21.5	8.0	5.0
2021	18,658,756	7,767,866	10,890,890	58.4	3,899	2,619	1,280	53.4	13.1	20.6	7.9	5.0
2020	19,027,410	7,885,033	11,142,377	58.6	3,931	2,637	1,294	54.0	13.1	20.3	7.7	4.9
2019	19,630,178	8,363,889	11,266,289	57.4	3,982	2,679	1,303	54.4	13.2	20.3	7.4	4.7
2018	19,651,412	8,444,614	11,206,798	57.0	4,042	2,703	1,339	55.2	13.4	19.5	7.3	4.9
2017	19,778,151	8,571,314	11,206,837	56.7	4,313	2,828	1,485	56.0	13.6	18.9	7.1	4.4
2016	19,846,904	8,638,422	11,208,482	56.5	4,360	2,832	1,528	56.9	13.7	18.2	6.9	4.3
2015	19,988,204	8,723,819	11,264,385	56.4	4,583	3,004	1,579	57.6	14.1	17.4	6.8	4.1
2014	20,209,092	8,797,530	11,411,562	56.5	4,627	3,011	1,616	58.3	14.5	16.5	6.6	4.1
2013	20,376,677	8,861,197	11,515,480	56.5	4,724	3,039	1,685	59.3	14.7	15.8	6.4	3.8
2012	20,644,478	8,919,006	11,725,472	56.8	4,726	3,026	1,700	60.3	14.9	15.0	6.3	3.5
2011	21,010,590	9,034,256	11,976,334	57.0	4,706	2,968	1,738	61.2	15.2	14.3	6.3	3
2010	21,019,438	9,045,759	11,973,679	57.0	4,599	2,870	1,729	62.6	15.0	13.5	6.3	2.6
2009	20,313,594	8,732,953	11,580,641	57.0	4,495	2,774	1,721	64.5	14.7	12.9	6.8	1.1
2008	19,081,686	8,177,714	10,903,972	57.1	4,409	2,719	1,690	65.5	14.0	12.3	7.1	1.1
2007	18,258,138	7,819,938	10,438,200	57.2	4,352	2,675	1,677	66.7	13.5	11.8	6.9	1.1
2006	17,754,230	7,572,265	10,181,965	57.3	4,314	2,629	1,685	67.4	13.3	11.4	6.8	1.1
2005	17,487,475	7,455,925	10,031,550	57.4	4,276	2,582	1,694	68.0	13.1	11.1	6.7	1.1
2004	17,272,044	7,387,262	9,884,782	57.2	4,216	2,533	1,683	68.5	13.0	10.8	6.6	1.1
2003	16,911,481	7,260,264	9,651,217	57.1	4,236	2,530	1,706	69.1	12.7	10.5	6.6	1.1
2002	16,611,711	7,202,116	9,409,595	56.6	4,168	2,466	1,702	69.5	12.4	10.4	6.7	1
2001	15,927,987	6,960,815	8,967,172	56.3	4,197	2,487	1,710	70.1	12.0	10.2	6.6	1.1
2000	15,312,289	6,721,769	8,590,520	56.1	4,182	2,450	1,732	70.8	11.7	9.9	6.6	1
1999	14,849,691	6,515,164	8,334,527	56.1	4,084	2,363	1,721	71.9	11.5	9.2	6.4	1
1998	14,506,967	6,369,265	8,137,702	56.1	4,048	2,335	1,713	72.4	11.3	8.9	6.4	1
1997	14,502,334	6,396,028	8,106,306	55.9	4,064	2,309	1,755	73.1	11.0	8.7	6.1	1.1
1996	14,367,520	6,352,825	8,014,695	55.8	4,009	2,267	1,742	73.8	10.8	8.4	6.0	1
1995	14,261,781	6,342,539	7,919,242	55.5	3,706	2,244	1,462	74.7	10.7	7.9	5.8	0.9
1994	14,278,790	6,371,898	7,906,892	55.4	3,688	2,215	1,473	75.4	10.5	7.6	5.6	0.9
1993	14,304,803	6,427,450	7,877,353	55.1	3,632	2,190	1,442	NA	NA	NA	NA	NA
1992	14,487,359	6,523,989	7,963,370	55.0	3,638	2,169	1,469	NA	NA	NA	NA	NA
1991	14,358,953	6,501,844	7,857,109	54.7	3,601	2,157	1,444	NA	NA	NA	NA	NA
1990	13,818,637	6,283,909	7,534,728	54.5	3,559	2,141	1,418	79.9	9.3	5.8	4.3	0.7
1989	13,538,560	6,190,015	7,348,545	54.3	3,535	2,127	1,408	NA	NA	NA	NA	NA
1988	13,055,337	6,001,896	7,053,441	54.0	3,565	2,129	1,436	NA	NA	NA	NA	NA
1987	12,766,642	5,932,056	6,834,586	53.5	3,587	2,135	1,452	NA	NA	NA	NA	NA
1986	12,503,511	5,884,515	6,618,996	52.9	3,406	2,070	1,336	NA	NA	NA	NA	NA
1985	12,247,055	5,818,450	6,428,605	52.5	3,340	2,029	1,311	NA	NA	NA	NA	NA
1984	12,241,940	5,863,574	6,378,366	52.1	3,331	2,025	1,306	NA	NA	NA	NA	NA
1983	12,464,661	6,023,725	6,440,936	51.7	3,284	2,013	1,271	NA	NA	NA	NA	NA
1982	12,425,780	6,031,384	6,394,396	51.5	3,280	1,984	1,296	NA	NA	NA	NA	NA
1981	12,371,672	5,975,056	6,396,616	51.7	3,253	1,979	1,274	NA	NA	NA	NA	NA
1980	12,096,895	5,874,374	6,222,521	51.4	3,231	1,957	1,274	83.5	9.4	4.0	2.4	0.7
1979	11,569,899	5,682,877	5,887,022	50.9	3,095	1,938	1,157	NA	NA	NA	NA	NA
1978	11,260,092	5,640,998	5,619,094	49.9	3,134	1,941	1,193	NA	NA	NA	NA	NA
1977	11,285,787	5,789,016	5,496,771	48.7	3,095	1,938	1,157	NA	NA	NA	NA	NA
1976	11,012,137	5,810,828	5,201,309	47.2	3,046	1,913	1,133	84.3	9.6	3.6	1.8	0.7
1975	11,184,859	6,148,997	5,035,862	45.0	3,026	1,898	1,128	NA	NA	NA	NA	NA
1970	8,580,887	5,043,642	3,537,245	41.2	NA	NA	NA	NA	NA	NA	NA	NA
1965	5,920,864	3,630,020	2,290,844	38.7	NA	NA	NA	NA	NA	NA	NA	NA
1957	3,323,783	2,170,765	1,153,018	34.7	NA	NA	NA	NA	NA	NA	NA	NA

A US Department of Education longitudinal survey of 15,000 high school students in 2002 and 2012, found that 84% of the 27-year-old students had some college education, but only 34% achieved a bachelor's degree or higher; 79% owe some money for college and 55% owe more than $10,000; college dropouts were three times more likely to be unemployed than those who finished college; 40% spent some time unemployed and 23% were unemployed for six months or more; and 79% earned less than $40,000 per year.

== Admission process ==
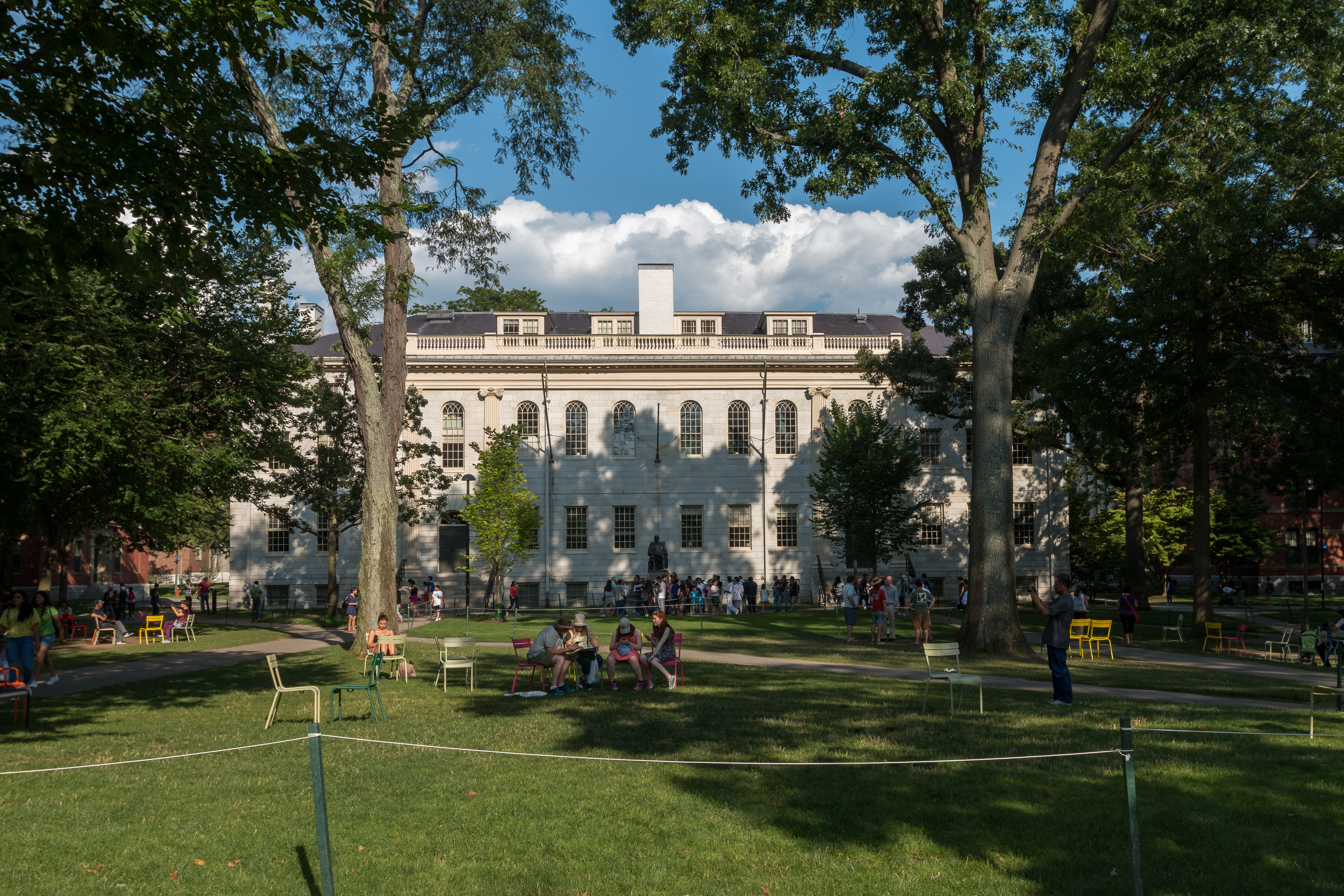
In 2021, Harvard College at Harvard University reported a 3.43% acceptance rate, making it one of the nation's most selective universities and colleges.

Students can apply to some colleges using the Common Application. With a few exceptions, most undergraduate colleges and universities maintain the policy that students are to be admitted to (or rejected from) the entire college, not to a particular department or major. (This is unlike college admissions in many European countries, as well as graduate admissions.) Some students, rather than being rejected, are "wait-listed" for a particular college and may be admitted if another student who was admitted decides not to attend the college or university. The five major parts of admission are ACT/SAT scores, grade point average, college application, essay, and letters of recommendation. The SAT's usefulness in the admissions process is controversial. Each state has its own set of residency laws and requirements that dictate educational benefits as a reward for state residence. As a result, public colleges and universities in many states charge out-of-state applicants a higher rate of tuition than resident students must pay.

=== Legacies and large donors ===
Admissions at elite schools include preferences to large investors and family members of alumni. Legislators have asked for transparency with donors and college admissions, but there are several groups that oppose it. Inside Higher Ed's 2018 survey of college admissions directors found that 42 percent of private colleges and universities used legacy status as a factor in admissions decisions.

== International study and student exchange ==
In 2016–17, 332,727 US students studied abroad for credit. Most took place in Europe, with 40% of students studying in five countries: the United Kingdom, Italy, Spain, France, and Germany.

The US is the most popular country in the world for attracting students from other countries, according to UNESCO, with 16% of all international students going to the US (the next highest is the UK with 11%). A total of 1,126,690 foreign students enrolled in American colleges in 2023–24. The largest number, 331,602, came from India. According to Uni in the USA, despite "exorbitant" costs of US universities, higher education in America remains attractive to international students due to "generous subsidies and financial aid packages that enable students from even the most disadvantaged backgrounds to attend the college of their dreams".

== Government coordination ==
Most states have an entity designed to promote coordination and collaboration between higher education institutions. Examples include the Alabama Commission on Higher Education, California Postsecondary Education Commission, Texas Higher Education Coordinating Board, Washington State Higher Education Coordinating Board, and The Georgia Department of Technical and Adult Education.

== Academic labor ==
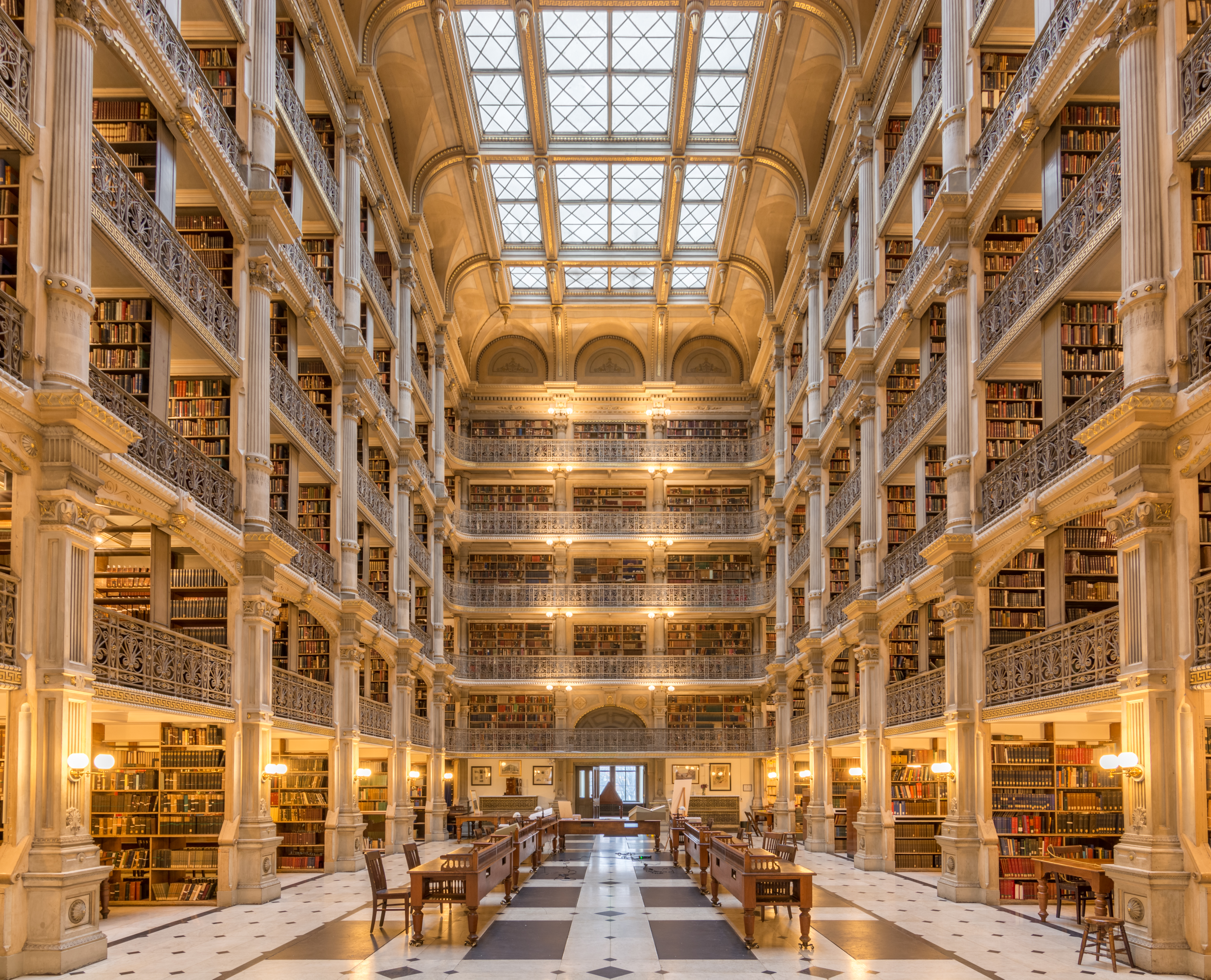
The George Peabody Library at Johns Hopkins University in Baltimore

Until the mid-1970s, when federal expenditures for higher education fell, there were routinely more tenure-track jobs than Ph.D. graduates. In the 1980s and 1990s there were significant changes in the economics of academic life. Despite rising tuition rates and growing university revenues, professorial positions were replaced with poorly paid adjunct positions and graduate-student labor. Community colleges and for-profit colleges rely almost exclusively on adjuncts for instruction.

The following unions represent higher education faculty and staff:

- American Association of University Professors
- American Federation of Teachers
- Service Employees International Union
- United Auto Workers

=== Adjunctification ===
In 2017, 17% of faculty were tenured. 89% of adjunct professors worked at more than one job. An adjunct was paid an average of $2,700 for a single course. While student-faculty ratios remained the same since 1975, administrator-student ratio went from 1–84 to 1–68. In 2018, the American Association of University Professors (AAUP) reported that 73% of all faculty positions were filled by adjuncts.

According to the American Federation of Teachers, "nearly 25 percent of adjunct faculty members rely on public assistance, and 40 percent struggle to cover basic household expenses" and just 15 percent of adjuncts said they are able to comfortably cover basic expenses from month to month."

Adjunct organizations include the Coalition for Contingent (COCAL), the New Faculty Majority, and SEIU Faculty Forward. The American Federation of Teachers and the International Brotherhood of Teamsters have also organized contingent academic labor.

=== Unionizing and labor actions ===
2022 and 2023 were record years for academic labor strikes in the United States.

== Sports ==
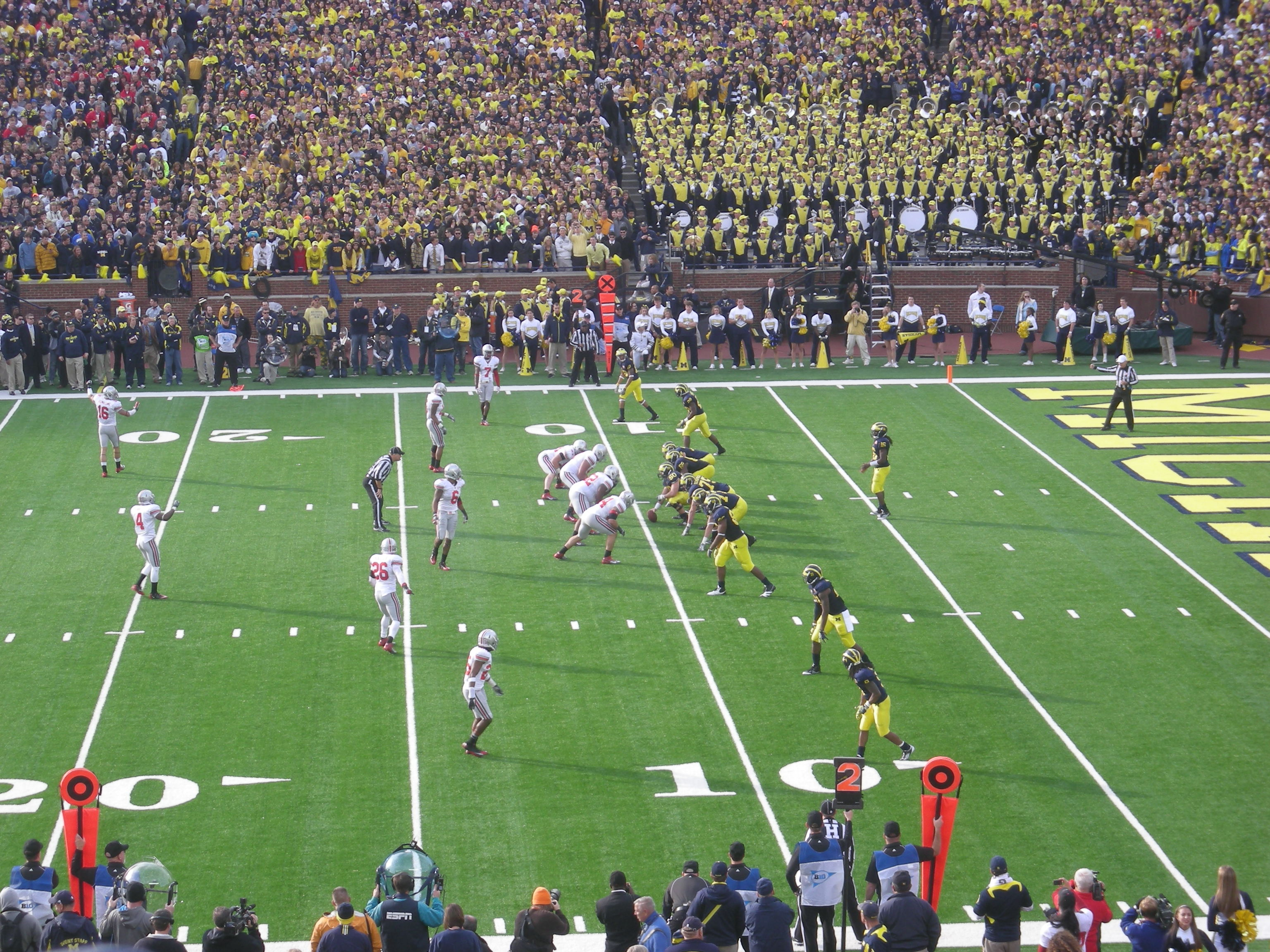
Michigan on offense against Ohio State during the 2011 game in Ann Arbor Michigan–Ohio State football rivalry

College athletics in the US is a three-tiered system. The first tier consists of elite sports that make a profit. The second tier includes sports sanctioned by one of the collegiate sport governing bodies that break even or lose money. Some of these collegiate sports governing organizations like the National Collegiate Athletic Association (NCAA) are umbrella non-profit organizations that govern multiple sports. Additionally, the first and second tiers are characterized by selective participation; some colleges offer athletic scholarships to intercollegiate sports competitors. The third tier includes intramural and recreational sports clubs, which are available to more of the student body. Competition between student clubs from different colleges, not organized by and therefore not representing the institutions or their faculties, may also be called "intercollegiate" athletics or simply college sports.

The most competitive collegiate sport governing body in the first and second tiers is the NCAA, which regulates athletes of 1,268 institutions across the US and Canada. The NCAA uses a three-division system of Division I, Division II, and Division III. Division I and Division II schools can offer scholarships to athletes for playing a sport, while Division III schools cannot offer any athletic scholarships. Division I schools, which generally are larger than either Division II or III institutions, must further meet additional requirements: among them, they must field teams in at least seven sports for men and seven for women or six for men and eight for women, with at least two team sports for each gender. Each division is then further divided into several conferences for regional league play. The names of these conferences, such as the Ivy League, are also metonyms for their respective schools.

College sports are popular on regional and national scales, at times competing with professional championships for prime broadcast, print coverage. In most states, the person with the highest taxpayer-provided base salary is a public college football or basketball coach. This does not include coaches at private colleges. The average university sponsors at least 20 different sports and offers a wide variety of intramural sports. There are approximately 400,000 men and women student-athletes that participate in sanctioned athletics each year.

Varsity esports have been growing since the 2010s. As of 2019, there were 125 esports teams at colleges and universities in North America.

== Issues confronting higher education in the United States ==
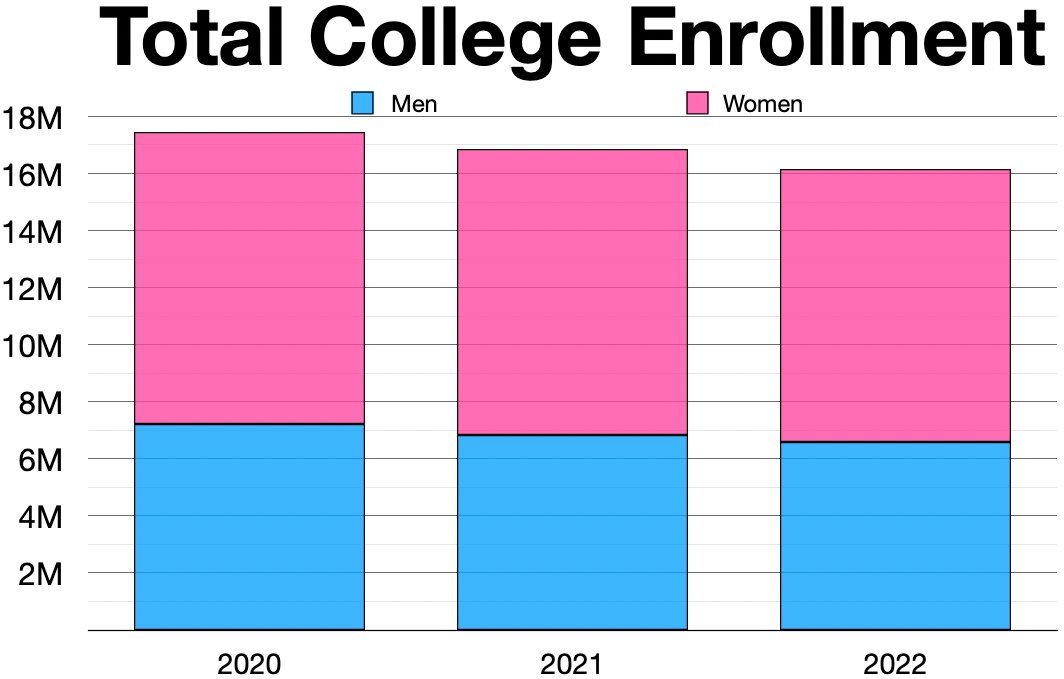
College enrollment Men Women

College rankings and the financial value of degrees have been the subject of discussion, leading to considerations about socioeconomic status, race and ethnicity, and gender. Some issues students have faced include colleges failing to teach soft skills such as critical thinking, remuneration and underemployment among various degrees, rising tuition and increasing student loan debt, austerity in state and local spending, the adjunctification of academic labor, student poverty and hunger, and educational inflation.

Strong research funding has helped elite American universities dominate global rankings in the early 21st century, making them attractive to international students, professors and researchers. However, other countries have begun offering incentives to compete for researchers as funding is threatened in the US, and US dominance of international tables has lessened. Higher education in the U.S. has also been negatively affected by fly-by-night schools, diploma mills, visa mills, and predatory for-profit colleges. There have been some attempts to reform it through federal policy such as gainful employment regulations, but they have been met by resistance.

Public opinion about colleges has been declining, especially among Republicans and the white working class. The higher education industry has been criticized for being unnecessarily expensive, providing a difficult-to-measure service which is seen as vital but in which providers are paid for inputs instead of outputs, payments come from third parties and not users, and federal regulations drive up costs. In a 2018 Pew survey, 61 percent of those polled said that US higher education was headed in the wrong direction. A 2019 Gallup survey found that, among graduates who strongly felt a purpose in life was important, "only 40 percent said they had found a meaningful career after college." In 2023, the Wall Street Journal reported that 56 percent of Americans thought a bachelor's degree was a bad bet.

In 2021, US student loan debt amounted to more than $1.7 trillion.

According to research from EY-Parthenon, less than half of all four-year colleges were financially stable in 2022.

=== Declining enrollment, mergers, and campus closures ===
Falling birth rates result in fewer people graduating from high school. The number of high school graduates grew 30% from 1995 to 2013, then peaked at 3.5 million. Liberal arts programs have been declining for decades; from 1967 to 2018, college students majoring in the liberal arts declined from 20 percent to 5 percent.

Since 2011, enrollment in postsecondary education in the United States has declined by more than 2 million people. Researchers hypothesize that the primary factors leading to this drop in enrollment are low birth rates over the last couple decades, a more successful economy, and the increasing cost of postsecondary education coupled with a decrease in financial aid and student debt. Some potential students are also questioning the cost-benefit ratio of a college education and if it is necessary to gain employment, opting instead for vocational education. In a 2021 Wall Street Journal article titled "Hobbled for Life," Melissa Korn and Andrea Fuller found that many master's degrees at elite schools did not pay off.

In 2018, the National Center for Education Statistics projected stagnant enrollment patterns until at least 2027. Demographer Nathan Grawe projected that lower birth rates following the Great Recession of 2008 would result in a 15 percent enrollment loss, beginning in 2026.

In 2019, the National Center for Education Statistics continued to project that higher education enrollment would remain stagnant, but white enrollment would drop 8 percent from 2016 to 2027. The report projected black enrollment to increase by 6 percent, Hispanic enrollment to increase 14 percent, Asian/Pacific Islander enrollment to increase 7 percent, and American Indian/Alaska Native enrollment to decrease 9 percent during the same period. In March 2019, Moody's warned that enrollment declines could lead to more financial problems for the higher education industry. In a 2019 survey by Inside Higher Ed, nearly one in seven college presidents said their campus could close or merge within five years. The total number of degree granting colleges in the US peaked in 2012 and has decreased every year since then.

In "The Higher Education Apocalypse", U.S. News & World Report education reporter Lauren Camera speculated that recent closings of schools in New England might be the beginning of a rash of college closures. An analysis of federal data from The Chronicle of Higher Education shows "about half a million students have been displaced by college closures, which together shuttered more than 1,200 campuses."

=== Foreign financial influence ===
The European Parliament issued a briefing document in 2019 stating that authoritarian regimes were attempting to use donations to influence academia to gain influence and "undermine democracies" while reducing academic independence and subverting faith in science. A 2023 report by the National Contagion Research Institute, a pro-Israel think-tank, alleged that US universities have illegally undisclosed information regarding US$13 billion in donations from foreign countries, stating that part of these donations originate in authoritarian regimes. Lawmakers in the US have suggested that the Chinese government has attached agendas to its funding that has at times involved political goals. Furthermore, some institutions funded are pressured to alter and adjust themselves to the foreign donor, triggering fear of potential influence. The phenomena has led to US universities facing scrutiny from federal legislators. The internationalization of higher education continues to interest academia in many nations as to its aims.

== See also ==
- Association of American Universities
- Lists of American universities and colleges
- Postgraduate year
- Intellectual disability and higher education in the United States
