= Jeremy Johnson (entrepreneur) =

Technology entrepreneur

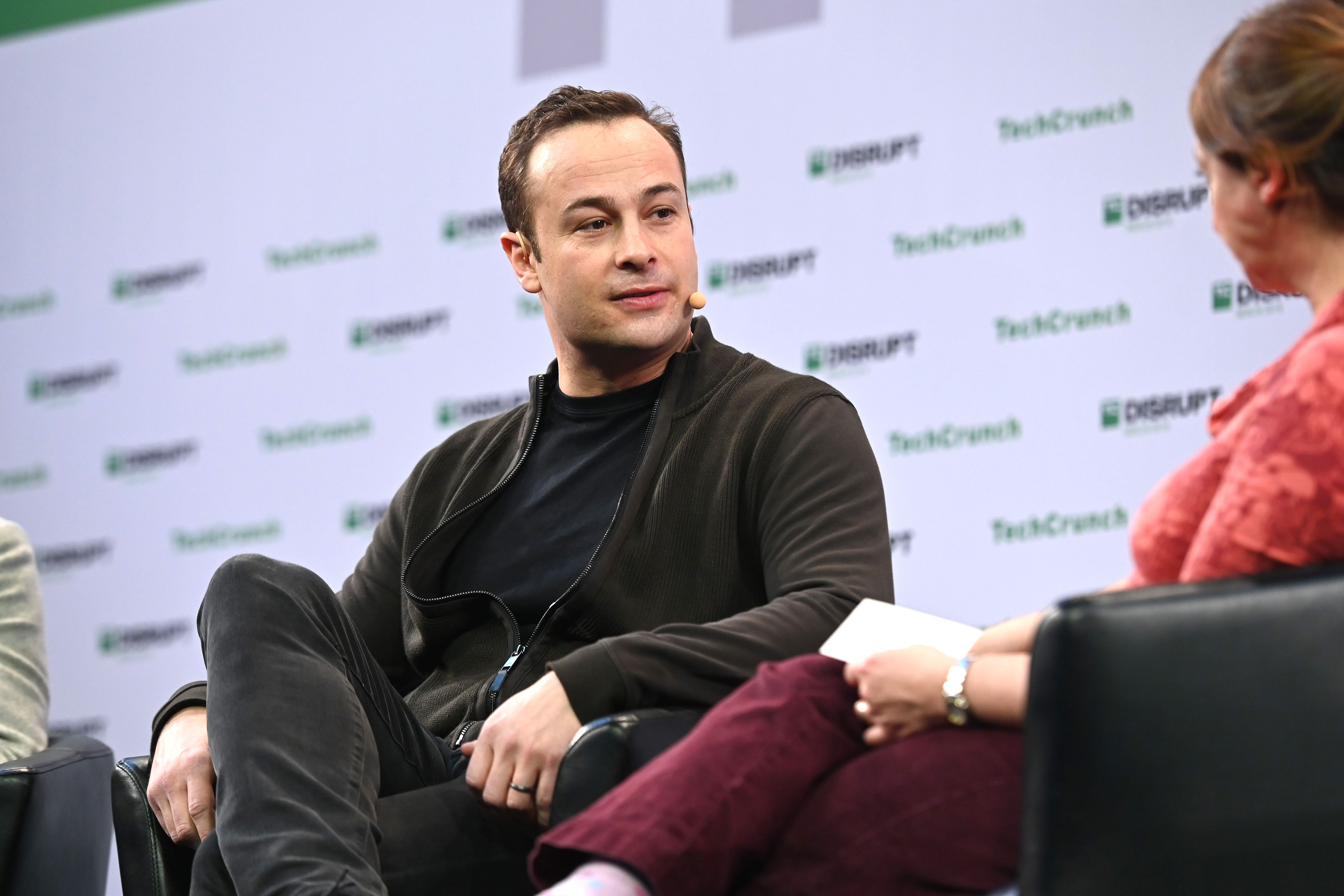
- Johnson at TechCrunch Disrupt Berlin in 2019
- Education: Princeton University
- Occupation: Technology entrepreneur
- Known for: Co-founding 2U and Andela

Jeremy Johnson is a technology entrepreneur who co-founded the education technology company 2U and the technology-talent company Andela. He served as Andela's chief executive officer from its founding in 2014 until September 2024 and remained on the company's board.

== 2U ==
Johnson attended Princeton University. In 2006, he and two other Princeton undergraduates won a $10,000 Princeton Entrepreneurs' Network prize for a proposed college-admissions platform. Johnson subsequently left Princeton to work on the venture full-time.

In 2008, Johnson co-founded 2U with John Katzman and Chip Paucek. Johnson served as the company's chief marketing officer. The company partnered with universities to develop and operate online degree programs. Its first program, a master's degree in teaching offered with the USC Rossier School of Education, launched in 2008. By 2012, it also operated programs with the University of North Carolina at Chapel Hill, Georgetown University and Washington University in St. Louis.

2U completed an initial public offering and began trading on the Nasdaq stock exchange in March 2014.

== Andela ==
Johnson co-founded Andela in 2014 with Iyinoluwa Aboyeji, Christina Sass, Ian Carnevale, Nadayar Enegesi and Brice Nkengsa. The company initially recruited and trained software developers in Africa and placed them on remote engineering teams at international companies.

In 2016, the Chan Zuckerberg Initiative led a $24 million investment in Andela, its first lead investment in a company. In January 2019, Andela raised $100 million in a funding round led by Generation Investment Management. At the time, the company reported more than 200 customers and approximately 1,100 developers working with client companies.

In 2020, Andela closed its physical campuses, adopted a fully remote operating model and expanded its applicant pool across Africa.

In August 2024, Andela announced that Carrol Chang would succeed Johnson as chief executive, effective September 17. Johnson remained a director of the company.

== Recognition ==
Johnson was included in Inc. magazine's 2012 30 Under 30 list and in Forbes's 30 Under 30 lists for 2013 and 2014.
