= For-profit higher education in the United States =

For-profit higher education in the United States refers to the commercialization and privatization of American higher education institutions. For-profit colleges have been the most recognizable for-profit institutions, and more recently with online program managers, but commercialization has been part of US higher education for centuries. Privatization of public institutions has been increasing since at least the 1980s.

== History ==
For-profit colleges in the U.S. have their origins in the Colonial Era. According to AJ Angulo, 19th century for-profit colleges offering practical skills expanded across the United States, meeting a demand for practical job training. A student could take any courses, and they generally did not offer degrees or dormitories or extra-curricular activities. Typically they hired local businessmen to give occasional courses. In the 1830s and 1840s, proprietary business schools in Boston, Brooklyn, and Philadelphia offered penmanship and accounting classes. The expansion continued in the 1850s and 1860s, to Chicago, New Orleans, Memphis, and San Jose. Angulo estimated that there were 2,000 for-profit colleges with more than 240,000 students during the period, if fly-by-night schools were included. The Bryant & Stratton Chain School grew to about 50 schools by 1864. After graduating from high school in 1901 Harry S. Truman decided not to attend the state university like his friends. He was more interested in continuing his advanced piano lessons in Kansas City. He also took three occasional courses at Spalding's Commercial College, including typing, shorthand, and accounting. These proved useful in getting an office job with a major bank, and later when he kept the books on his family farm. The decline of proprietary colleges was a result of the Smith-Hughes Act of 1917, also known as the National Vocational Education Act, which funded free public vocational education.

In 1893, two years after International Correspondence Schools (ICS) started their profitable and increasingly popular business, others followed, including University of Chicago, Penn State College, and University of Wisconsin. Through several social movements and public funding, the US slowly became more inclusive and education became more universal. But some for-profit entities pushed the envelope with deceptive marketing and advertising promising more than they could deliver.

Since the early twentieth century critics have complained about money rather than academics driving leadership at traditional universities. Thorstein Veblen's 1918 famous screed on the topic, The Higher Learning in America, was subtitled, "A Memorandum on the Conduct of Universities by Business Men." While nonprofit university leaders have faced increasing pressures to grow funding and endowments, the lines separating nonprofit and for-profit institutions have been more strictly enforced in the U.S. than in nearly any other country, contributing to American dominance in higher education. In 1923, muckraker Upton Sinclair published The Goose Step: A Study of American Education, a 488-page account of monied interests at elite colleges and universities, which concluded that all of the institutions he researched were plutocratic. Sinclair reportedly interviewed 1000 people across the US and used a variety of primary and secondary sources, particularly from the American Association of University Professors. The Goose Step mentions a number of industrialists and entrepreneurs, including Andrew Carnegie (Carnegie Tech), John D. Rockefeller (University of Chicago), Johns Hopkins, J.P. Morgan (Columbia University), and Leland Stanford (Stanford University).

=== Growth of for-profit colleges (1945–2010) ===
In the 1940s, "fly-by-night commercial vocational 'schools' sprang up to collect veterans' tuition grants" due to the newly created GI Bill's lax requirements and limited oversight. For-profit colleges grew again from 1972 to 1976, after the Higher Education Act of 1965, part of President Lyndon Johnson's "Great Society" of progressive reforms, was amended so that for-profit colleges could receive Pell Grants and federal student loans.

University of Phoenix was a pioneer as a for-profit mega-university, schools of over 80,000 students, with an emphasis on adult learners and a business attitude, and later with an emphasis on online learning. With profit-driven schools, academic labor was faced with unbundling, where "various components of the traditional faculty role (e.g., curriculum design) are divided among different entities, while others (e.g., research) are eliminated altogether."

From 1974 to 1986, for-profit colleges share of Pell Grants rose from 7 percent to 21 percent, even though for-profit colleges only enrolled 5 percent of all higher education students. In the 1980s, public higher education was also increasingly privatized. In the late 1980s, Secretary of Education William Bennett investigated the problems with for-profit higher education; investigators found widespread abuses across the industry.

=== Privatization, regulation, and deregulation (1980–present) ===
Since the 1980s, public universities, particularly state flagship universities have increasingly relied on for-profit revenue sources and privatization.

Regulations and policies to curb the abuses in for-profit higher education occurred during the presidency of Barack Obama. These actions were rolled back during the Donald Trump administration.

As for-profit colleges face declining enrollment, there has been a blurring between for-profit and non-profit institutions. For-profit Online Program Managers (OPMs) serving public and private non-profit schools include 2U, Academic Partnerships, Bisk Education, Noodle Partners, Pearson Education, and Wiley. In 2018, there were more than two dozen OPMs. Human capital contracts, also known as Income Share Agreements (ISAs) may also be seen as for-profit vehicles.

== For-profit colleges ==
For-profit colleges, also known as proprietary colleges, are post-secondary schools that survive by making a profit for their investors. For-profit colleges have frequently offered career-oriented curricula including culinary arts, business and technology (including coding bootcamps), and health care. These institutions have a long history in the US, and grew rapidly from 1972 to 2009, fueled by government funding and corporate investment. Approximately 40 percent of all for-profit college campuses have closed since 2010. Concerns about for-profit school owners converting to nonprofit while retaining profit-making roles led lawmakers to request an examination of the situation by the U.S. Government Accountability Office. Two states, Maryland and California, enacted laws to review the legitimacy of nonprofit claims by colleges.

== EdTech and for-profit online program managers (OPMs) ==
Online program managers (OPMs) play a significant role in online education, serving many colleges and universities, including elite schools. However, the industry has felt a great deal of economic pressure. The largest OPM's are: 2U, Academic Partnerships, Bisk Education, Pearson Learning and Wiley Education Solutions.

In 2007, Academic Partnerships was founded, and a year later, 2U. In 2010, Noodle was created. By 2018 there were approximately 30 OPMs and experts were reporting that a shakeout would occur.

In June 2018, Inside Higher Education published "A Tipping Point for OPM?" which stated that most experts thought a "shakeout" would be occurring among Online Program Managers. In July 2019, 2U shares dropped more than 50 percent when it lowered its growth expectations. According to a Century Foundation analysis of 70 universities, OPMs create an increasing risk to students and public education. According to the report "this growing private control – which is often hidden from public view – is jeopardizing the quality of online programs, stripping control from colleges and universities, and putting students at risk of predatory behavior and abuse at the hands of for-profit companies."

In January 2021, in anticipation of an edtech bubble, Class Acceleration Corporation (CLAS.U), a special-purpose acquisition company (SPAC) was formed, raising $225 million in its initial public offering. In March 2021, Coursera, became a publicly traded corporation. In June 2021 2U announced they would be acquiring edX, "to create an entity that would reach 50 million learners and serve most of the best universities in the United States and the world."Guild Education, an intermediary in employee education benefits, also grew in value, from $1 billion in 2019 to $3.75 billion in 2021, adding Target Corporation to its list of large corporate clients. In September 2021, Anthology, a higher education administrative software firm, announced that would merge with Blackboard.

In 2022, 2U acquired edX, a platform for massive open online courses.

In 2023, the US Department of Education announced that OPMs would be subject to greater oversight, to include audits. Higher education institutions would be required to report details about their agreements with OPMs by May 1, 2023. The same year, Edtech expert Phil Hill said that the OPM model is now "on life support."

== Privatization, affordability, and access of services at state flagship universities ==
Since the 1980s, public universities, particularly state flagship universities have increasingly relied on for-profit revenue sources and privatization.

Public colleges and universities have increasingly relied on for-profit businesses for a number of products and services, including food service. For example, Sodexo, Aramark, and Compass Group are three major for-profit food servicers.

Today, most state flagship universities are not affordable for low- and moderate-income families as these schools cater more toward affluent students. According to the U.S. Department of education the cost of 4-year bachelor's degrees, has doubled in the last 30 years even when accounting for inflation. The increased cost of tuition for higher education leads to multiple detrimental effects both socially and economically within the U.S. including preventing access to college education, decreasing individual student health, and increasing the chances of a debt crisis. In 2013, the average cost of tuition was 3.5 times that of a median households annual income.

In 2023, the Chronicle of Higher Education found that 75 percent of the university officials they surveyed said private-public partnerships were increasing.

== Federal oversight ==
From the late 1980s to the mid-1990s, Senator Sam Nunn led for more scrutiny of for-profit colleges. The General Accounting Office (GAO) also found that 135 for-profit colleges contributed to 54% of all student loan defaults. The number of for-profit colleges rose from about 200 in 1986 to nearly 1,000 in 2007. From 1990 to 2009, for-profit colleges grew to 11.8 percent of all undergraduates. For-profit college enrollment expanded even more after the 1998 reauthorization of the Higher Education Act resulted in more deregulation. The industry also grew in the wake of state budget cuts, stagnation, and austerity in funding that grew more visible in the 1980s and 90s. Initial public offerings of Devry, ITT Educational Services, Apollo Education Group, Corinthian Colleges, and Career Education Corporation occurred between 1991 and 1998 and for-profit colleges became "the darlings of Wall Street." The advent of the Internet also helped enrollment as many for-profit colleges were pioneers in online education. The George W. Bush administration further deregulated the industry as posts at the Department of Education (ED) were filled with for-profit administrators. Increased capitalization of for-profit colleges occurred after Goldman Sachs, Wells Fargo, Blum Capital Partners and Warburg Pincus became large institutional investors in this industry. Private equity in for-profit education was associated with higher costs to students and declining outcomes: less spent on education, more student loan debt and lower student loan repayment rates, lower graduation rates, and lower earnings for graduates.

In the 2009–2010 academic year, for-profit higher education corporations received $32 billion in Title IV funding – more than 20% of all federal aid. More than half of for-profits' revenues were spent on marketing or extracted as profits, with less than half spent on instruction.

A two-year congressional investigation chaired by Senator Tom Harkin, D-Iowa, examined for-profit higher education institutions. The committee found that $32 billion in federal funds were spent in 2009–2010 on for-profit colleges. The majority of students left without a degree and carried post-schooling debt. Recruitment training manuals at some schools specifically targeted low-income students and attempted to elicit 'pain' and 'fear.' The manuals even included groups to target, including: "welfare mom w/kids", "pregnant ladies", and "experienced a recent death." In 2010, Trump University was closed by the State of New York for operating without a license.

As for-profit colleges began to falter, for-profit online program managers (OPMs) gained momentum. Under the Obama administration (2009–2017), for-profit colleges received greater scrutiny from the U.S. government. State Attorneys General, the media, and scholars also investigated these schools. For-profit school enrollment reached its peak in 2009. Corinthian Colleges and Education Management Corporation (EDMC) faced enrollment declines and major financial trouble in 2014 and 2015. In 2015, Corinthian Colleges filed for bankruptcy. Enrollment at the University of Phoenix chain fell 70% from its peak In 2016, ITT Technical Institute closed, and the US Department of Education stripped ACICS of its accreditation powers. In 2017, the advocacy group the Debt Collective created its own, unofficial "Defense to Repayment App" allowing former students of schools accused of fraud to pursue debt cancellation.

From 2017 to 2020, the Donald Trump administration accused the government of regulatory overreach and loosened regulations. In 2018 Strayer University and Capella University merged as Strategic Education. EDMC sold its remaining schools to the non-profit Dream Foundation and Purdue University purchased Kaplan University. Atalem sold DeVry University to Cogswell Education. In 2018, U.S. Education Secretary Betsy Devos scrapped a 2010 ED "gainful employment" rule. Later that year, Education Corporation of America began closing its campuses. ED also restored ACICS as an accreditor. In 2018 and 2019, Dream Center Education Holdings began closing and selling off schools of the Art Institutes, Argosy University, and South University. In 2019, Argosy University closed. USA Today portrayed the school's collapse as part of a trend, highlighting the losses of other for-profit colleges, including Brightwood College (2018), Vatterott College (2018), and Virginia College (2018). In 2019, Betsy DeVos was criticized for allowing five failing for-profit colleges to avoid posting a letter of credit. Accreditor WASC approved Ashford University's conversion to a non-profit. Its parent company, Zovio, continued to be a publicly traded for-profit college company. In December 2020, Congress passed a bill that improved safeguards for veterans exploited by predatory colleges.

== Education assistance and employee tuition discount programs ==
Companies can recruit and retain employees by offering them education assistance and employee tuition discounts. Guild Education is a for-profit company that works with employers such as Walmart and Disney to offer tuition assistance from several colleges, including University of Arizona Global (formerly Ashford University), Purdue University Global (formerly Kaplan University), and University of Florida. Companies like Pathstream also leverage tuition assistance to help companies offer development programs (credentialed by universities like Emory University and Texas A&M) to their employees.

== Private loans and student loan servicers ==
While most student loans are owned by the federal government, for-profit student loan servicers collect a large amount of the student loan debt. Navient, Wells Fargo, and Discover Financial Services have been among the largest student loan lenders. FFEL loans and private loans are packaged, rated by rating agencies, and sold off as Student Loan Asset-Backed Securities (SLABS). For-profit student loan servicers have included Maximus Inc., Sallie Mae, Navient, Great Lakes Borrowers and Nelnet. In 2020, there was a resurgence in private student loans.

== Sources of funding & revenue ==
The main sources of initial capital for large proprietary colleges and online program managers are institutional investors: international banks, hedge funds, institutional retirement funds, and state retirement funds. Some smaller schools are family owned businesses. At elite universities, donors may serve as significant sources. Stanford University and Johns Hopkins University were built with funds from their founders.

For-profit institutions also obtain funds through student private loans, corporate loans, and the selling of assets.

=== GI Bill funds, Department of Defense Tuition Assistance and MyCAA ===
The for-profit education industry also receives billions of dollars through VA benefits also known as the GI Bill. According to a CBS News report in 2017, 40 percent of all GI Bill funds went to for-profit colleges. For-profit colleges receive money for servicemembers and their spouses attending college while still in the military. In fiscal year 2018, for-profit colleges received $181 million or 38 percent of all DOD TA funds. For-profit schools also receive money from DOD for education of military spouses. The program is known as MyCAA.

=== Bootcamps ===
Coding bootcamps and other tech boot camps are a popular route for acquiring technical skills quickly. However, there may already be an oversupply of graduates and some coding bootcamps have already closed. Some privately run bootcamps were acquired by for-profit educational companies. In 2014, Kaplan acquired Dev Bootcamp. In 2016, Capella University acquired Hackbright Academy, a coding bootcamp for women, for $18 million. In October 2020, online program manager 2U announced that it had established more than 50 additional bootcamps.

=== Loans, bonds, and sale of assets ===
For-profit corporations also obtain cash flow through student private loans, corporate loans, and the selling of assets. Colleges and universities may generate capital for large projects like sports stadiums, dormitories, and other infrastructure by issuing bonds that are created, rated, and sold to investors.

=== Research parks ===
Research parks and medical facilities make up a considerable amount of revenue for brand name US Universities. There are more than 130 research parks in the US. These parks do research for private companies and federal agencies and they patent pharmaceuticals and other scientific products.

=== Land holdings ===
US universities, especially elite schools, hold large amounts of land, giving them an enormous amount of local political power.

=== State and county funds ===
Community colleges receive funds from counties and states. States partially fund state colleges and universities. State flagship universities often rely on more diverse revenue streams.

== Credit rating agencies ==
For-profit credit rating agencies evaluate the credit worthiness of higher education institutions. Credit rating is an essential element for obtaining capital for large infrastructure projects. The rating agencies also evaluate Student Loan Asset-Backed Securities. The three major credit rating agencies are Moody's, Standard and Poor's, and Fitch Ratings.

== Recruiting, advertising, and lead generators ==
The for-profit college industry has spent billions of dollars on student recruiting, advertising, and buying leads for recruitment. The colleges' marketing departments rely heavily on Lead Generators, which are companies that find potential students ("leads") and provide their personal information and preferences to for-profit college.

In 2016, Noodle CEO John Katzman estimated that about $10 billion per year is being spent on higher education marketing and advertising. For-profit colleges use lead generation companies to target potential students and to take their personal information. However, as competition has heated up in U.S. higher education, traditional schools have also employed them. Lead generators use multiple strategies to find and enroll students. There are hundreds of sites on the internet that gather information for schools. The most notable lead generator is Education Dynamics. In September 2020, Education Dynamics purchased QuinStreet's higher education vertical.

== Politics and political lobbying ==
Politics and lobbying play a significant part in the history of U.S. for-profit school growth. The for-profit education industry has spent more than $40 million on lobbying from 2007 to 2012. and $36 million since 2010. For-profit education lobbying grew from $83,000 in 1990 to approximately $4.5 million in its peak year of 2012. In 2019, colleges and universities spent almost $75 million in federal lobbies. The most significant industry lobby is Career Education Colleges and Universities (CECU), previously known as The Association of Private Sector Colleges and Universities (ASPCU). Before 2010, the organization was known as the Career College Association. The Cato Institute's Center for Educational Freedom also supports for-profit higher education.

== Government scrutiny, criminal and civil investigations ==
According to A.J. Angulo, for-profit higher education in the U.S. was the subject of government scrutiny from the mid-1980s to the 2010s.

In August 2010, the GAO reported on an investigation that randomly sampled student-recruiting practices of several for-profit institutions. Investigators posing as prospective students documented deceptive recruiting practices, including misleading information about costs and potential future earnings. They also reported that some recruiters urged them to provide false information on applications for financial aid. Out of the fifteen sampled, all had engaged in deceptive practices, improperly promising unrealistically high pay for graduating students, and four engaged in outright fraud, per a GAO report released at a hearing of the Health, Education, Labor and Pensions Committee on August 4, 2010.

In 2014, a criminal investigation of Corinthian Colleges was initiated. Until 2015, The U.S. Attorney General and at least eleven states maintained an $11 billion lawsuit against Education Management Corporation. The U.S. Consumer Financial Protection Bureau also has a suit against ITT Educational Services, parent company of ITT Tech. In 2016, Alejandro Amor, the founder of FastTrain, was sentenced to eight years in federal prison for fraud.

Debate over federal public policy regarding for profit higher education has been an ongoing issue since the late 1960s. In 2015, the Obama administration introduced numerous legislation aimed at allowing students to make informed decisions about attending colleges and universities that were within their budget. The American Graduation Initiative was legislation introduced by the Obama administration to increased academic progress requirements for financial aid to ensure that students finish their education. The administration also introduced America's College Promise (ACP) which was intended to support the American Graduation Initiative, make higher education more accessible and build the economy. The ACP was intended to spend $61 billion to make the first 2 years of community college free for students. This legislation was not passed during the Obama administration but has been re-introduced to the Senate in 2021 under the Biden administration.

The U.S. Department of Education (DoED) proposed "gainful employment regulations" would provide more transparency and accountability to institutions that offer professional and technical training. According to DoED, this regulation is an attempt to "protect borrowers and taxpayers." In his 2015 budget proposal, President Obama recommended greater regulation of for-profit education, including a closure of the loophole that exempted GI Bill money from being used in the 90–10 formula.

The Trump administration revoked regulations aimed at protecting students from predatory practices by for-profit colleges, reversing the rules adopted during the Obama administration. In 2019, Trump's Secretary of Education Betsy DeVos issued a complete final repeal of the 2014 "gainful employment rule" (a regulation that never came into effect, but would have cut federal funding from colleges whose graduates consistently had high debt compared to their incomes). The repeal was effective July 1, 2020. DeVos was also a vocal opponent of "borrower defense to repayment" applications, claims from recipients of federal student loan who sought loan forgiveness on the grounds that they were defrauded or misled by their colleges. DeVos derided the program as a "free money" giveaway to borrowers; during her tenure as secretary of education, department staff were given only about 12 minutes to process each application, some of which ran to hundreds of pages.

In August 2017, DeVos instituted policies to loosen regulations on for-profit colleges. In September 2017, the Trump administration proposed to remove conflict of interest rules between VA officials and for-profit colleges. In March 2018, the House Subcommittee on Labor, Health and Human Services, Education and Related Agencies began reviewing problems related to for-profit colleges and student loan debt. Lobbyists for the for-profit higher education industry took several steps to stop regulation and to fight against transparency and accountability. They also supported at least two lawsuits to squash gainful employment regulations.

== See also ==
- Career college
- Diploma mill
- For-profit colleges in the United States
- Higher education in the United States
- List of for-profit universities and colleges
- List of unaccredited institutions of higher education
- Neoliberalism
- Online program manager
- Privatization in the United States
- Proprietary colleges
- Student debt
- University of Phoenix
- For-Profit Online University, a 2013 Adult Swim television special that is a mock infomercial for a for-profit university
