= Andela =

American technology recruitment company

Andela Inc
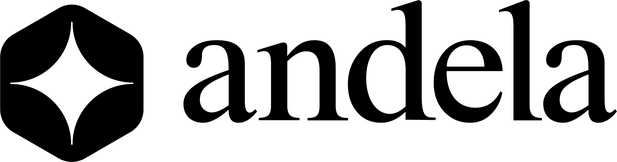
- Official logo
- Trade name: Andela
- Type: Private
- Genre: Global Talent Marketplace
- Founded: May 21, 2014; 12 years ago
- Headquarters: Remote
- Area served: Worldwide
- Key people: Carrol Chang (CEO) Jeremy Johnson (Co-Founder & Former CEO)
- Services: Programming, Freelance, Marketplace, Recruitment, Programmer, Technologist, Product Manager, Designer
- Number of employees: 308 (August 2024)
- Website: Andela.com

Andela is a private marketplace for technical talent. Andela focuses on sustainable careers, connecting technologists with long-term engagements, access to international roles, and competitive compensation.

Andela allows companies to access technical talent in approximately 135 countries who are skilled in application development, artificial intelligence, data engineering, cloud, and DevOps. It sources, screens, and onboards the talent, handling the entirety of the hiring lifecycle. Andela uses AI/ML in its platform to match applicants with available roles.

== History ==
Andela was founded in 2014 by Jeremy Johnson, Iyinoluwa Aboyeji, Nadayar Enegesi, Brice Nkengsa, Ian Carnevale, and Christina Sass. In May 2014, Andela launched their first recruitment cycle in Lagos by putting their first call for applications on Twitter. The company hired their first cohort—four Nigerian software engineers—after receiving 700 applications for 4 spots.

Between 2015 and 2017 Andela had Mark Zuckerberg and Jack Dorsey come to visit their campuses in Lagos and Nairobi.

In 2018, Andela celebrated the first two sets of engineers to complete the four-year program.

In 2019, Christina Sass stepped down from her full-time role as President and transitioned into a supporting role as the Chair of the Andela Advisory Council and the Andela Alumni Group.

While the initial route for engineers to join the company was via the Andela Fellowship, a four-year program geared towards junior engineers, this changed in 2019. Andela widened its hiring criteria for mid and senior-level engineers in Lagos, Nairobi, and Kampala. After their first remote expansions to Ghana and Egypt, the entire organization went fully remote in 2020.

As of 2021, Andela provided technologists from six continents the ability to access opportunities with global companies on long-term embedded contracts. Andela’s applicants could undertake training in software languages such as Ruby on Rails, JavaScript, Python, Ruby, React Native, Node, PHP, and more.

In March of 2023, Andela purchased Qualified, an assessment platform that verified engineers. Andela purchased Casana, a network of IT talent based in Munich, in May of 2023. Through the acquisition of Casana, Andela increased its presence in Europe.

At present, Andela is a two-sided marketplace with clients including Mastercard Foundry, GitHub, Goldman Sachs, Nebula.io, Kinship, Mindshare and ViacomCBS on the employer side, and a pool of over 150,000 digital talent on the contractor talent side. About 60% of those contractors are in Africa and Latin America, but Andela spans 135+ countries overall.

On August 22, 2024, Carrol Chang, a longtime Uber executive who led its global driver and courier operations, was appointed as Andela's new chief executive officer.

== Business model ==
Andela operates as a two-sided marketplace. They identify and recruit technologists from around 135 countries (with a 60% concentration in digital talent in emerging markets, such as Africa and Latin America), and place them in remote contract roles with companies. As companies are able to hire persons from where they are residing, the effects of brain drain are mitigated. Andela provides individual contractors for clients to incorporate into their blended teams, full formed teams the client can then manage, or fully managed teams.

Andela vets the technical talent before accepting them into its private on Andela Marketplace. The vetting is done through a series of online assessments. Technical assessments are conducted through Qualified by Andela, a developer assessment platform. Soft skills assessment are conducted to understand how prospective employees will engage with their future teammates and to better understand their preferences around work. Lastly, a broader leadership assessment test is used in the match process with regard to candidates and their prospective employers. Andela uses all of this data, combined with what they know about the company and hiring manager, to create a "match fitness score" to predict the probability that a given candidate will be successful in a specific role.

Through its Andela Learning Community, Andela has partnered with numerous global technology companies to provide training programs and scholarships to technologists in Africa. Partners include Google, Microsoft, Pluralsight, among others. Members of the Andela Learning Community have either earned basic skills in software design and development, or advanced applications like React Native, Google Cloud, Android, and other mobile web services. This community enables engineers to access additional learning resources and information, connect with mentors, source career opportunities and interact with fellow learners. From 2014 to 2024, Andela trained around 110,000 technologists in Africa through the Andela Learning Community. Thus, 15% of Africa's base of around 716,000 engineers were educated through Andela.

== Funding ==
On June 25, 2015, Andela secured $10 million in Series A funding. Spark Capital led the investment and many of the Seed investors participated.

The following year, The Chan Zuckerberg Initiative—founded and owned by Facebook founder Mark Zuckerberg and Priscilla Chan—led in Andela’s $24 million Series B round of funding, making it the first lead investment ever for the foundation.

In October 2017, Andela secured $40 million in Series C funding, bringing the total the company had raised to $80 million. The investment, led by CRE Venture Capital—a South African-based venture firm—is one of the largest investments to be led by an African venture firm into an African company.

In January 2019, Generation Investment Management, a sustainable investment management firm, led Andela's $100M Series D round of funding, bringing Andela’s total venture funding to $180M. The Series D also included Serena Williams’ investment platform, Serena Ventures.

On September 29, 2021, Andela announced $200M Investment led by Softbank Vision Fund 2 with participation from new investor Whale Rock and existing investors including Generation Investment Management, Chan Zuckerberg Initiative, and Spark Capital. Lydia Jett, founding partner at SoftBank Investment Advisers, joined Andela’s Board of Directors. The Series E financing valued the company at $1.5 billion, making it the first unicorn talent marketplace. Andela is one of the seven unicorn companies founded in Africa.

Andela's AI Academy trained 200 developers in GitHub Copilot as a part of a multi year partnership with GitHub, with plans to train 1,000 more by the end of 2025 and 2,000 in 2026. In June 2025, Andela teamed up with Emergence AI to launch a brand new training program for software engineers. it's to train software engineers in multi agent AI systems. They acquired Woven, a technical assessment company, to strengthen its test capabilities for AI engineers in January 2026.
