= Adam Robinson =

Adam Robinson may refer to:

- Adam M. Robinson Jr. (born 1950), Surgeon General of the US Navy
- Adam Robinson (author), American educator, freelance author, and a US Chess Federation chess master
- Adam Robinson (rugby league) (born 1987), rugby league footballer
