= WSJ On Campus =

- Type: Print and online newspaper
- Owner(s): News Corp (via Dow Jones & Company), Unigo
- Language: English

WSJ On Campus is a print and online newspaper created through a strategic partnership between The Wall Street Journal and the college website Unigo.

WSJ On Campus pairs The Wall Street Journal's reporters with Unigo's network of hundreds of thousands of current college students on more than 7,000 campuses across the U.S.

A key feature of the WSJ On Campus brand is the integration of professional journalism from WSJ with crowd-sourced student content from Unigo to create original stories on college admissions and college life. Paul Bascobert, chief marketing officer at Dow Jones & Company, announced the creation of WSJ On Campus alongside Jordan Goldman, Unigo's founder and CEO. Stories from WSJ On Campus have won multiple awards from The Association of Educational Publishers, including Best Education Portal, Best Social Media and Best Education Website.

In addition to original reporting, WSJ On Campus also produces live webcasts examining key issues around college admissions and college life. Webcasts are hosted by Jordan Goldman and broadcast on the homepage of WSJ.com. To date, WSJ On Campus webcasts have featured Goldman interviewing Deans of Admissions from Princeton University, the University of Pennsylvania, Columbia University, the Massachusetts Institute of Technology, Brown University, Williams College, Wesleyan University, Bryn Mawr College, Grinnell College, New York University, Penn State and the University of Vermont.
