= Trilogy Education Services =

New York City-based technology education company

- Type: Subsidiary
- Industry: Education technology
- Founded: 2015; 11 years ago, in New York City, New York, US
- Founder: Dan Sommer
- Fate: Acquired by 2U in 2019
- Headquarters: New York City, New York, United States
- Key people: Dan Sommer (CEO)
- Services: For profit education
- Parent: 2U

Trilogy Education Services (often shortened to Trilogy Education) is a New York City-based technology education company that offers non-credit technology training programs, colloquially known as coding bootcamps, through affiliate universities. In-person courses are held on the affiliate university campus. Revenue from the tuition is shared with the affiliate university.

Program graduates receive a non-credited professional certificate from the partner school and career advisement. There is no job placement guarantee and no third-party verified jobs reports have been released, though outcome data is privately shared with partner universities. The partner schools do not regard program graduates as university alumni, nor program enrollees as university students. The programs cost US$10,000 to US$13,000 and are not eligible for federal loans, nor do students receive a Form 1098-T.

The company was founded in 2015. In June 2017, the company received US$30 million in a Series A funding, followed by US$50 million in Series B funding in May 2018. It was bought by Maryland-based education technology company 2U in April 2019 for US$750 million.

== History ==
Trilogy Education was founded in 2015 by Dan Sommer, whose father was a trustee for State University of New York. The younger Sommer had previously worked for an OPM, an acronym for companies which help universities bring their courses online. Rutgers was the company's first university partner.

In June 2017, the company received $30 million in a Series A funding round led by investment firm Highland Capital Partners. By then, the company had 250 employees. In September, the company announced it was partnering with Monterrey, Mexico-based Tecnológico de Monterrey (ITESM), to create a tech training program on ITESM's Mexico campus. Trilogy Education also started working with the University of Toronto in Canada.

In May 2018, the company received an additional $50 million, in a Series B funding round co-led by Highland Capital Partners, Macquarie Capital and Exceed Capital. At the time, the company reported it had 7,500 current students currently enrolled, and 2,000 graduates of its programs. As of July, the company was working with 37 universities. It also announced it was looking outside of North America for additional partnerships.

In October 2018, Trilogy expanded its education and career-services offerings through the acquisitons of The Firehose Project, an online coding boot camp, and JobTrack, a customer relationship management platform designed for career-services departments.

In July 2019, Trilogy partnered with the Johns Hopkins University Whiting School of Engineering to create a web development boot camp for working professionals in the Baltimore area.

It was bought out by 2U in 2019 for $750 million, with $400 million in cash (in part with a short-term $250 million loan) and $350 million in newly issued shares of common stock. The acquisition was managed by Citigroup and Morgan Stanley. The acquisition increased 2U's number of university partners from 36 to 68, expanded its reach into the Mexican, German, Australian, and Canadian markets, and will allow for the company to reach a projected $1B in revenue in 2021.

Prior to the buyout, Trilogy had planned an initial public offering.

On July 25, 2024, 2U filed for Chapter 11 bankruptcy protection. The company plans to continue operating as a private company which will eliminate over $450 million of its debt.

On December 4, 2024, 2U announced that it would be shutting down its boot camp offerings with no new enrollments being accepted immediately. Students who were already enrolled would be able to complete their courses, but no new enrollments were accepted.

== Business ==
Universities share their brands and facilities with Trilogy Education, and provide oversight of the curriculum, instructors, and student experience, in exchange for a share of the tuition revenue. The courses are not taught by the university's professors, but by industry professionals with at least three years of experience. The company produces programs in areas such as web development; user interface/user experience; data analytics and visualization; and cybersecurity. Students train in coding languages such as JavaScript, jQuery, Node.js, Java, HTML, CSS and Python, and the curriculum is developed centrally in GitHub.

Revenue from the tuition is shared with the affiliate university. Though the exact revenue split has not been publicly shared, similar programs have a 50/50 split.

Partner schools included Rutgers, ITESM, and the University of Toronto, the University of Pennsylvania, the University of Washington, Columbia University, the University of Texas-Austin, Georgia Tech and the University of California at Berkeley.

Program graduates receive a professional certificate (non-credit) from the partner school and career advice. There is no job placement guarantee and no third-party verified jobs reports have been released, though outcome data is privately shared with partner universities. The programs cost $10,000 to $13,000, though discounts may be available for partner university alumni. Trilogy's non-credit programs are not considered "eligible educational institutions" by the United States Department of Education and do not qualify for federal loans nor do students do not receive a Form 1098-T. Trilogy does not offer Income Share Agreements and there are no money-back guarantees. The affiliates schools do not regard program graduates as university alumni, nor program enrollees as university students.

The typical enrollee is a nontraditional student aged 31.

== Corporate training partnerships ==
Trilogy also developed customized technology-training programs for corporate clients. In 2018 it partnered with TEKsystems and Southern Methodist University to operate a three-month coding boot camp for employees. Trilogy also created a company training program for General Electric through Georgia Tech.
