= USA Today / Unigo College Guide =

- Author: USA Today Editors, Unigo, Jordan Goldman
- Language: English
- Subject: Education, Higher Education, Guidebooks
- Genre: Non-fiction
- Published: 2012, 2013 (Gannett Publishing Services / USA Today)
- Publication place: United States
- Pages: 152 pp

The USA Today / Unigo College Guide is a 152-page book created through a partnership between USA Today and the college information website Unigo and published by Gannett Publishing Services, the book publishing arm of USA Today.

== Content ==
The USA Today / Unigo College Guide features articles written by USA Today education reporters covering topics including how to find a college, how to look good across all aspects of the college application, how to make the most of college visits, decoding college costs, how to pay for college in a troubled economy, the value of SAT scores in college admissions decisions, costs for incoming college freshmen and more. The Guide also includes statistics, student ratings and comprehensive reviews of more than 150 colleges across the United States sourced from current college students and provided by Unigo.

The USA Today / Unigo College Guide represents USA Today's first entrance into the college guide space traditionally dominated by publishers like U.S. News & World Report. The partnership between USA Today and Unigo to produce the USA Today / Unigo College Guide was profiled by Mashable, Fox Business News, NY Observer, Yahoo, Study.com and many additional outlets.
