= USC Rossier School of Education =

Graduate school in Los Angeles, California, United States

Coordinates: 34.021924°N 118.283899°W

- Type: Private
- Established: 1909
- Parent institution: University of Southern California
- Dean: Pedro A. Noguera
- Faculty: 93
- Postgraduates: 1478
- Doctoral students: 577
- Location: Los Angeles, California, United States
- Website: rossier.usc.edu

The USC Rossier School of Education is one of the graduate schools of the University of Southern California. Rossier offers six master's degree programs, a Doctor of Education in Organizational Change and Leadership (Ed.D.) degree, a Global Executive Doctor of Education (Ed.D.) and a Ph.D. in Urban Education Policy. Rossier also offers online programs including a master's in teaching English to speakers of other languages, an online Ed.D., an online master's in school counseling, and an online Master of Arts in teaching. Rossier places an emphasis on the study of urban education locally, nationally and globally. The school also houses the USC Language Academy and the Office of Professional Development.

== History ==
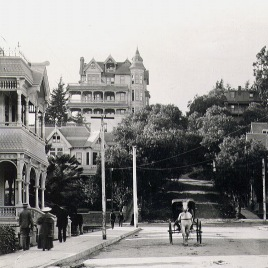
University of Southern California

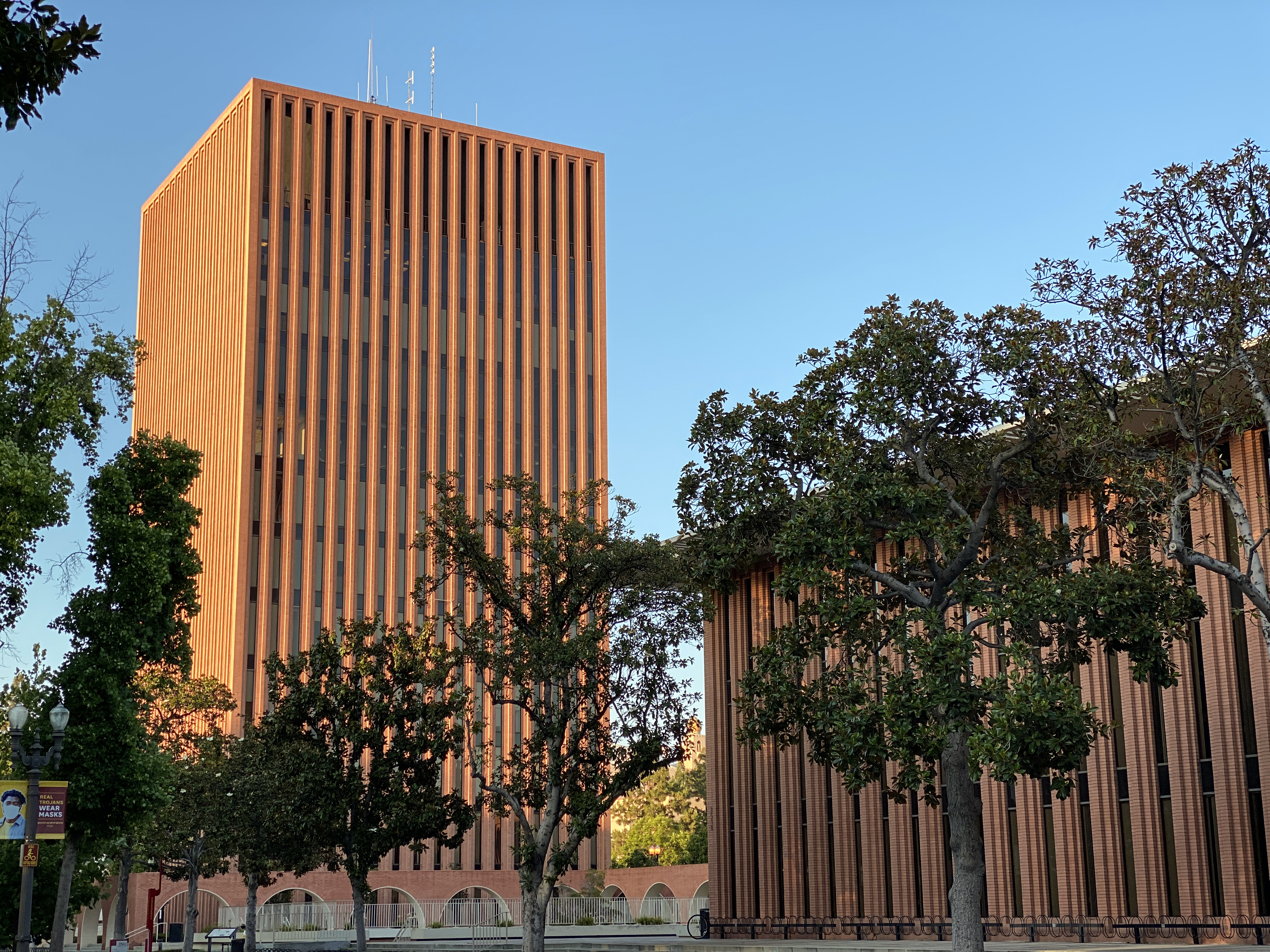
Waite Phillips Hall, home to the USC Rossier School of Education

When USC was founded in 1880, Los Angeles was transforming from a small town to a progressive city. In eight years, the city's population swelled from 11,000 to 70,000. Before L.A.'s streets were even paved, these new Angelenos had established the University of Southern California in order to train the professionals necessary to serve the emerging metropolis. Among the professionals most in demand were teachers and school administrators. Classes in education at USC began in the 1890s with a Department of Pedagogy. The Department of Education was established in 1909 as part of the college, and the formal School of Education was established in 1918 with Thomas Blanchard Stowell as the founding dean.

During the 1960s, the teaching profession changed substantially. Explosive growth in Southern California led to a rapid expansion of the public school system. There was a sudden shortage of qualified teachers, a rise in the development of teachers' unions, a demand for greater professionalism of school administrators, and the centralization of schools into unified school districts. Rossier responded to these changes by refocusing on the professional training and expertise administrators needed in these new governance structures. Over 100 superintendents in California are USC education alumni.

In 1998, alumni Barbara J. and Roger W. Rossier gave $20 million to the school, which was at the time the largest gift to any school of education in the world. In recognition of their generosity and the importance of their vision for the future of education, the school was renamed in their honor.

In 2009, Dean Karen Symms Gallagher joined up with USC philanthropist and technology innovator John Katzman and his company 2U to create a new online Master of Arts in Teaching degree program, the MAT@USC. The program was a new initiative to prepare thousands of students to be teachers in high-need schools. The program has since expanded its degree offerings to include a Master of Education in Advanced Instruction degree, a Special Education Credential and Gifted Certificate, and a Doctor of Education degree in Organizational Change and Leadership. The combined program is known as USC Rossier Online.

Three former students in the online graduate program, in December 2022, filed a class action lawsuit alleging the school, to boost rankings, misrepresented data supplied to U.S. News and World Report. Rossier removed itself from the rankings in early 2022.

== Pullias Center ==
The Pullias Center for Higher Education is located at the University of Southern California Rossier School of Education. The center brings “a multidisciplinary perspective to complex social, political, and economic issues in higher education” (Pullias, 2012). Research at the center is characterized as theory informed with “real-world applicability.” The center is focused on improving urban higher education, strengthening partnerships with schools, and understanding international education. A link for cultural literacy offers information on outside journals and publications.

== Rankings ==
The U.S. News & World Report ranked the school at No. 11 (tie) in 2022. However, the ranking was withdrawn from US News's graduate school rankings after the school found out that it had submitted inaccurate data for at least five years.

== Notable alumni ==
- Marlo Thomas (B.S. 1959) - Actress, producer, and social activist known for starring on the sitcom That Girl and her award-winning feminist children's franchise, Free to Be... You and Me.
- Ethel Percy Andrus (M.A. 1928, Ph.D. 1930) - First woman high school principal in California; founder of the National Retired Teachers Association (NRTA) and the American Association of Retired Persons (AARP)
- Leo Buscaglia (B.A. 1950, M.A. 1954, Ph.D. 1963) - Bestselling author, professor of special education and counseling at Rossier
- Loren Grey (Ph.D. 1959) - Author and educational psychologist
- Ellis O. Knox (M.A. 1928, Ph.D. 1931) - First African American to be awarded a Ph.D. on the West Coast and professor emeritus at the University of Southern California and the University of California, Los Angeles
- Cindy Hensley McCain (B.A. 1976, M.A 1978) - chair, Hensley & Co., Philanthropist
- Kent M. Keith (Ed.D. 1996) - Former president, Chaminade University
- Thelma "Pat" Nixon (Teaching Credential, 1937) - Former First Lady of the United States
- Robert A. Underwood (Ed.D. 1987) - President, University of Guam; former Delegate from Guam to the United States House of Representatives
- Frances C. Wilson (Ed.D., 1981) - President, National Defense University; former lieutenant general in the United States Marine Corps
- Mike Davis (EML, 2010, Ed.D., 2018) - President Pro Tempore, City of Los Angeles Board of Public Works; California State Assemblyman (2006–2012)
- Rao Machiraju (EdD, 1987 Instructional Technology) DigiKeyIH Partner, Executive in Residence, University of Southern California
