= Petroleum Training Institute =

Petroleum training institution of Nigeria

Petroleum Training Institute (PTI) is located in Effurun, Delta State, Nigeria. It was established in 1973 by the federal government of Nigeria as a prerequisite for the membership in the Organization of Petroleum Exporting Countries (OPEC) to train indigenous middle-level manpower to meet the labour force demands of the oil and gas industry in Nigeria and the West African subregion. It awards General Welding Certificates, ND (National Diploma) and HND (Higher National Diploma) certificates. The P.T.I Act:1972 No.37 was an act to establish the Petroleum Training Institute to provide courses of instruction training, to research in petroleum technology, and to produce technicians and other skilled personnel required to run the petroleum industry.

In 2022, the Petroleum Training Institute (PTI) celebrated its 50th Anniversary at the Petroleum Technology and Development Fund Building in Abuja on October 13, with the theme "Fifty Years of Education, Innovation & Technological Development." The event featured prominent dignitaries, including the President of the Petroleum and Natural Gas Senior Staff Association of Nigeria (PENGASSAN), Comrade Festus Osifo; the Olu of Warri, His Majesty Ogiame Atuwatse III; and the CEO of NNPCL

== Overview ==
The PTI is currently headed by principal and CEO Henry Adimula, who was appointed to the position on June 17, 2021. Adimula had previously served as the institute's vice principal, and later as acting principal, following the expiration of the four-year term of former principal Prof. Sunny E. Iyuke, on July 3, 2020.

== Quality policy ==
The Petroleum Training Institute Quality Policy is in compliance with the requirements of ISO9001 which is geared towards the provision of quality service delivery and training of personnel to meet client's requirements in conformity with global best practices.

== Departments ==
The following are the departments in the institution:

- Petroleum & Natural Gas Processing (PNGPD)
- Industrial Safety and Environmental Technology (ISET)
- Petroleum Marketing and Business Studies (PMBS)
- Petroleum Engineering and Geosciences (PEG)
- Electrical/Electronics Engineering (EEED)
- Welding Engineering and Offshore Technology (DWEOT)
- Mechanical Engineering (MED)
- Science Laboratory Technology (SLT)
- Computer Science and Information Technology (CSIT)
- Computer Engineering (COMPT)
- Environmental Science and Management Technology (ESMT)

== Achievements ==
Since its inception in 1972, PTI has graduated over 50,000 technologists, technicians, and other technical personnel in various areas in oil and gas and allied industry operations.

== Library ==
The library is under the management of librarian Abigail O. Oghene. it is structured under the director of library and information technology, with digital and computer tech departments.

== See also ==
- List of polytechnics in Nigeria
