= Olugbenga Agboola =

Nigerian software engineer and entrepreneur (born 1985)

Olugbenga Agboola OON
- Born: 1985 (age 40–41); Lagos, Nigeria
- Education: University of Westminster, Massachusetts Institute of Technology
- Occupation: businessman
- Years active: 2018–present

Olugbenga Agboola OON (born 1985) is a Nigerian software engineer, entrepreneur, and business leader. He is the CEO and co-founder of Flutterwave, Vice Chairman of the U.S.-Africa Business Center Board, and a member of prominent business organizations including the Milken Institute Africa Business Leaders Council, the Wall Street Journal CEO Council, and the Fast Company Impact Council. He launched Go Time AI, which is designed to support African startups building artificial intelligence products which offers up to $200,000 in funding and mentorship to selected startups.

== Educational background ==
He holds a degree in Electrical Engineering from Obafemi Awolowo University in Nigeria and an MBA from the University of Oxford's Said Business School. His educational background has contributed to his strong technical and business understanding.

== Career ==
Born in Lagos, Agboola is a graduate of the MBA program at MIT Sloan School of Management. Prior to founding Flutterwave with Iyinoluwa Aboyeji in 2016, he worked as an application engineer at PayPal and held roles in product management at Google. His earlier fintech venture, which focused on alternative payment methods, was acquired by a major Nigerian bank. Agboola acquired Mono, a Nigerian open-banking startup founded in 2020, through an all-stock deal valued at between $25 million and $40 million.

== National honours ==
Agboola was decorated with Nigeria's National Honour Medal of the Officer of the Order of Niger (OON) by President Muhammadu Buhari in recognition of his contributions to the advancement of technology, innovations and economic development. He was awarded the honour alongside Ameyo Adadevoh, Abubakar Abdullahi, Jim Ovia, Tony Elumelu, amongst others.

== Recognition and awards ==
Agboola was listed on Fortune's 40 Under 40 list in 2020. He was also on Time's Next 100 list in 2021. In April 2022, Agboola received the Tech Investor of the Year award in the Business Insider Africa awards.

In 2022, Agboola was conferred with National award of Officer of the Order of the Niger (OON) by President Muhammadu Buhari. In 2024, he was named ThisDay’s Young Global Leader of the Year, celebrating exceptional young leaders across different sectors.
