= Risepoint =

American educational online program manager

- Formerly: Academic Partnerships
- Founded: 2007; 19 years ago
- Founder: Randy Best
- Area served: Global
- Key people: Fernando Bleichmar (CEO)
- Services: Educational technology
- Number of employees: 1,500
- Website: risepoint.com

Risepoint (formerly known as Academic Partnerships) is an education technology company that partners with higher education institutions, providing market research, student and faculty support, and technology. Risepoint is owned by Vistria Group, a private equity firm. Michael Feldstein of EdSurge has said that because of its early start as an online program manager (OPM), Risepoint has been considered "a pioneer" in the business. Risepoint's clients, which are mostly regional public universities, are lower in price than elite colleges, but face significant financial and enrollment challenges. According to the company, it has served 825,000 students and 25,000 online courses.

On May 1, 2024, Academic Partnerships rebranded as Risepoint. Its CEO is Fernando Bleichmar.

== History ==
In 2007, Academic Partnerships (AP) was established as Higher Ed Holdings. In 2007, Education Holdings helped Lamar University establish online programs, and quickly expanded to other universities including the University of Texas system and Arkansas State University. An article in Forbes characterized the company's efforts as "using the Web to turn struggling midlevel U.S. universities into global education brands."

In 2011, former Florida Governor Jeb Bush was hired as an adviser to Higher Ed Holdings. Bush was also an investor. Bush was able to broker an education deal for AP with Florida International University

In 2013, Clayton Christensen, a Harvard Business School professor and creator of the theory of disruptive innovation became a senior advisor to Academic Partnerships.

In March 2014, the firm paid Hillary Clinton $225,000 to deliver a speech. In December of that same year, Jeb Bush resigned from his position at AP in preparation for his bid for a 2016 presidential run.

In 2014, AP was characterized as a "profit machine" that could reduce the cost of educating an undergraduate by about 85 percent. By 2015, AP had annual sales of $100 million and contracts with 40 U.S. colleges and universities. AP was previously owned by Insight Partners, a venture capital and private equity firm.

In 2017, the firm appointed Dan Branch, a former Texas House member and Chairman of the Texas House Committee on Higher Education, to the board.

In 2019, Vistria Group, a Chicago-based equity firm, acquired Academic Partnerships for the Vistria II fund. Vistria has investments in a number of for-profit education assets, including Edmentum, Vanta Education, FullBloom Education, MSI Information Services, Apollo Education Group, and Unitek Learning.

In 2020, University of Texas-Arlington President Vistasp Karbhari resigned after taking two international trips paid by Academic Partnerships. The school paid AP "more than $178 million over about a five-year period."

In 2020, Academic Partnerships was one of five online program managers that Senators Elizabeth Warren and Sherrod Brown targeted for scrutiny. The senators said that they were typically not transparent and that they were concerned that these OPMs might be violating rules meant to rein in for-profit colleges.

In 2023, Academic Partnerships acquired Wiley University Services for $150 million. The acquisition closed in January 2024 and expanded the combined company's university partner network to more than 125 institutions. Following the acquisition of Wiley University Services, Academic Partnerships rebranded as Risepoint in May 2024. The company stated its name change reflected the combination of the two organizations and portfolio of education technology services.

== Business Model ==
Risepoint operates as an education technology company that partners with colleges and universities to develop and grow online degree programs. The company provides services including marketing, enrollment management, student support, technology, and faculty support. It is not directly involved in instruction, and it does not confer degrees.

== Reception ==
Companies such as Risepoint have received criticism over concerns of privatization.

Concerns have been raised that Academic Partnerships and other online program managers work with limited oversight, and that the compensation structures of OPMs incentivize maximizing recruitment, being paid for each student recruited. It has been noted, including by Elizabeth Warren and Sherrod Brown, that these practices resemble those that are illegal for college admissions departments to engage in.

Supporters of revenue sharing online program management agreements argue that they enable universities to launch online degree programs without significant upfront capital expenditures.

== See also ==
- For-profit higher education in the United States
- Online program manager
- Randy Best
