= Blessing Abeng =

Nigerian entrepreneur (born 1994)

- Born: Blessing Abeng; 16 October 1994 (age 32); Jos, Nigeria
- Education: Covenant University
- Occupation: Entrepreneur
- Organization: Ingressive for Good
- Website: blessingabeng.com

Blessing Abeng (born 16 October 1994) is a Nigerian entrepreneur and co-founder of Disha, now acquired by Flutterwave. She is one of the founders of Ingressive for Good (I4G), a tech non-profit organization. In 2022, she won the African Achievers Awards of the year and in 2023, she was listed in the "Forbes Africa's 30 Under 30".

== Biography ==
Blessing Abeng was born on 16 October 1994 in Jos, Plateau State, Nigeria but originally hails from Cross Rivers State. After acquiring a degree in biochemistry from Covenant University, Nigeria, she proceeded to Orange Academy, Lagos where she studied branding professionally.

She co-founded Disha, a tech platform that first started as a link in a bio tool until it was acquired by Flutterwave in 2021. In 2017, Blessing Abeng became co-director of Startup Grind. She is a co-founder and also the Director of Communications at Ingressive for Good (I4G), a non-profit organisation that was founded alongside Maya Horgan Famodu and Sean Burrowes. The company also had partnership with Google. 1

== Recognition ==
In April 2023, Abeng was one of the Nigerians listed on the Forbes Africa's 30 Under 30 young influential Africans alongside six others including Tems and Ayra Starr. In 2022, she won the African Achiever Award of the year and was also included in the United Nations' most influential people of African Descent under 40. That same year, she won the Hereconmy Woman of the year award. In September 2021, Abeng was listed in the YNaija's 100 most powerful Nigerians under 40. In November 2021, she was nominated for the ELOY Awards.
