= Education Dynamics =

Higher education management corporation

EducationDynamics (EDDY) is a privately held higher education management corporation. Founded in 2005, the firm provides market research, advertising agency, multichannel marketing, lead generation, and enrollment management for over 500 US colleges with a particular focus on adult online education. It also partners with private lenders who provide student loans, produces marketing research about adult online students, and hosts the InsightsEDU Conference, formerly known as (CALEM).

== History ==
As a member of BMO Financial Group and Halyard Capital, the company was founded in 2005 as Halyard Education Partners. The company's first inquiry portal was eLearners.com, which works to pair prospective students with colleges and universities offering online programs.

In 2006, it acquired Educational Directories Unlimited, owners of StudyAbroad.com, GradSchools.com, and StudentProspector.com. That same year, the company launched a multi-platform US-based contact center.

In 2007, it acquired WorldClass Strategy, owner of EarnMyDegree.com.

The firm rebranded as EducationDynamics in 2007.

In 2009, EducationDynamics acquired Aslanian Market Research, a leading market research firm focused exclusively on understanding adult, non-traditional, and online college students through primary and secondary research. Aslanian Market Research was founded by Carol Aslanian, who continues to lead the market research solutions offered by EducationDynamics.

In 2010, it acquired Education Connection; in 2011, the Education Connection website reportedly had 350 colleges paying for leads, with 300,000 unique visitors per month and 40,000 signing up for help.

In 2015, Halyard Capital sold EducationDynamics to an investor group including Muirlands Capital, KnowledgeShares and Prudential Capital Group.

In 2016, EducationDynamics acquired EdPlus Holdings, which included Unigo.com and EStudentLoan.com.

In 2018 it acquired JMH Consulting, Inc, a boutique provider of marketing and bundled Enrollment Management Services.

In 2019, it purchased the digital marketing, search engine optimization, and call center businesses of Thruline, a higher education marketing agency based in Lenexa, Kansas.

In 2019, NBC News reported that Education Dynamics was targeting military veterans through Military-colleges.com.

In 2020, the firm purchased the Quinstreet higher education vertical, which included onlinedegrees.com, and schools.com. In September 2020, it also received capital infusions of $80 million from Whitehorse Capital and $12.5 million from Encina Business Credit. In November, 2020 the company announced the acquisition of the higher education portal classesUSA.

In 2021, it announced a strategic relationship with Nuro Retention, a company using analytics to improve student persistence.

EducationDynamics announced in October, 2021 that it had been purchased by Renovus Capital Partners.

== Leadership ==
EducationDynamics is led by Bruce Douglas, who has served as CEO since 2015 and previously held the role of Chief Marketing Officer (CMO). Prior to Douglas, the company was led by Tom Anderson.

== Services ==
The company focuses on delivering marketing and related enrollment/student engagement support services for online and adult-focused college programs. The firm's multi-channel marketing services include search engine optimization (SEO), digital marketing, Over-the-Top (OTT) marketing, awareness media and creative services. It provides coaching services for prospective students and for student success. It manages multiple inquiry generation websites, including gradschools.com, schools.com, elearners.com, and educationconnection.com. The company also conducts primary and secondary research on behalf of clients and releases numerous annual reports, including the Online College Students Report, Higher Ed Landscape Report and Enrollment Management Benchmarks Report.

=== Unigo ===
Unigo is a leading student search and scholarship site, acquired by EducationDynamics in 2016. Unigo owns the student loan marketplace estudentloan.com and provides student loan information for Bankrate.com. Unigo Student Funding partners with colleges to originate and service student loans.

=== Research ===
EducationDynamics produces research and reports about online adult education, with information on marketing trends, consumer demand, industry changes, and student retention. The reports include the annual Online College Students Report, and 2020 & Beyond Student Survey and Report. The Online College Students Report was part of a joint effort between EducationDynamics and Wiley Education Services (a subsidiary of John Wiley and Sons).

=== Conference ===
EducationDynamics hosts the annual InsightsEDU conference. The conference was previously known as the Conference on Adult Learner Enrollment Management and changed names after the 2021 conference. InsightsEDU offers higher ed leaders the opportunity to come together and discuss the latest trends and insights on attracting and engaging career-focused non-traditional students. The conference offers three tracks: Marketing, Enrollment Management, and Leadership.

== See also ==
- For-profit higher education in the United States
- Higher education in the United States
- Lead generation
- Student loans
