= Lydia Jett =

American venture capitalist

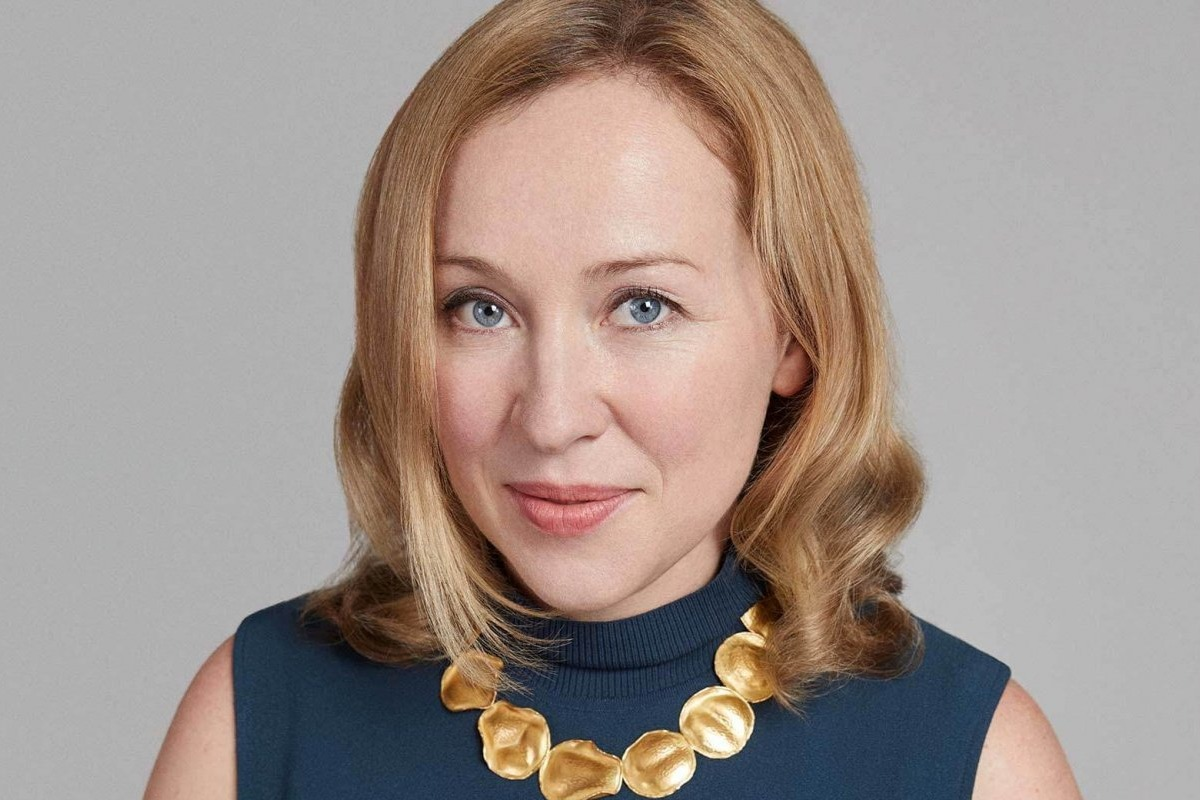
- Born: November 1980 (age 45); Oregon
- Citizenship: United States of America
- Education: Stanford Graduate School of Business, London School of Economics and Political Science, Smith College, Mountain View High School
- Occupations: Venture capitalist, Investor, Board Member
- Known for: Businessperson

Lydia Jett (born 1980) is an American venture capitalist and former executive at SoftBank Vision Fund. Ms. Jett is an independent board member at Walmart-owned Flipkart, Fanatics, Veho and Vimeo (Nasdaq: VMEO).

Jett has also held executive positions at Goldman Sachs, J.P. Morgan Securities, Inc. and M/C Partners.

== Career ==
In 2015, Jett joined SoftBank Group to launch their growth equity efforts. In 2017, Jett was a founding member of the Softbank Vision Fund, where she became Managing Partner and Head of the Consumer Internet Sector. Jett was the first woman named to Investing Managing Partner, and Investing Partner at Softbank Vision Fund.

Jett led investments in and represented Softbank on the Board of Directors of the firm’s global eCommerce investments including: Coupang, Fanatics, Flipkart, GoTo, and Klook, collectively the top returning portfolio for Softbank Vision Fund I.

Additionally, Jett and her team led investments into and represented SBIA on the Board of Directors several companies including: Andela, Embark, Klook, LTK, Pacaso, Weee!, Bytedance, ezCater, Aleo, and Quantstamp amongst other investments. Bloomberg reported Jett was departing Softbank in 2024.

Prior to launching SBIA, Jett was a senior member of the investment team at Softbank Group Corporation International (SBGI) where she helped lead SBGI’s Series D investments in Guardant Health, 10x Genomics and Series A investment into Fetch Robotics (sold to Zebra).

Jett served as an Independent Board Member on the Board of Directors of Coupang (NYSE: CPNG), Fanatics, Flipkart, Ozon (Nasdaq: OZON), Veho and Vimeo (Nasdaq: VMEO).

Jett has been recognized by Forbes as “generating one of the largest cash generating returns ever for a start-up investor, published work in Fast Company, been recognized as one of Fortune’s “Most Powerful Women.

Previously, Jett worked as an investment banking analyst at JPMorgan in New York, before working at Goldman Sachs in the Principal Investment Area and M/C Partners.
