= 90–10 rule =

American educational funding policy

The 90–10 rule refers to a U.S. regulation that governs for-profit higher education. It caps the percentage of revenue that a proprietary school can receive from federal financial aid sources at 90%; the other 10% must come from alternative sources.

Not all federal sources of financial aid have traditionally fallen under this cap, which initially only applied to federal student aid provided by the U.S. Department of Education. When the law was first enacted, funds supporting the education of troops and veterans, such as the G.I. Bill and Department of Defense Tuition Assistance program, were not subject to this cap until the American Rescue Plan was enacted in 2021. The 90/10 regulations now include GI benefits and apply to institutional fiscal years beginning on or after January 1, 2023, consistent with the effective date of the statutory changes to the 90/10 calculation.

The rule is intended to use a market mechanism to weed out the worst-performing proprietary schools. The requirement's intent was to ensure that no school rely solely on federal funding.

Since 2010, growing scrutiny of the for-profit industry has spurred new efforts to strengthen the 90–10 rule. Some veteran and military groups have pushed for the G.I. Bill and Tuition Assistance Program to be included in the funds that are capped. Democratic lawmakers have sought new regulations to improve reporting and transparency in the rule.

== History ==
The 90–10 rule's origin lies in the history of veterans' education benefits. After World War II, a number of proprietary, fly-by-night colleges emerged to meet the heightened demand for colleges from returning troops. Concerned with the quality of these schools, the Veteran Administration instituted an 85–15 rule, capping the percentage of a school's revenue from GI Bill funds at 85%.

In 1972, for-profit colleges became eligible to receive federal student financial aid under Title IV. There were then no restrictions on the percentage of revenue that could be received from these sources.

In the 1990s, lawmakers became concerned about for-profit colleges' quality and recruiting practices. Almost half of student loan defaults came from for-profit school students, who received only a fifth of loans. This growing concern led to efforts to impose more regulations on the industry.

The result was included in the 1992 Higher Education Act, which included the first iteration of the 90–10 rule. It required that a for-profit school receive no more than 85% of its revenue from Title IV financial aid sources. This rule was modeled after the earlier Veteran Administration regulation.

During the 1998 reauthorization of the Higher Education Act, Congress changed the 85–15 rule to the 90–10 rule. Now for-profit colleges could receive up to 90%, rather than 85%, of revenue from Title IV funds.

In 2021, the US Senate removed the 90–10 loophole as part of the American Rescue Act. As a bipartisan compromise, the measure did not take effect until 2023.

== 21st-century modification efforts ==
With increasing scrutiny of the for-profit school industry, the 90–10 rule has again become controversial. Many groups are advocating modification of the rule.

=== Including military and veteran benefits ===
Military and veteran benefits, such as the GI Bill and Department of Defense Tuition Assistance Program, are not subject to the 90–10 cap. Many for-profit colleges sought to take advantage of this exclusion and focused their recruiting on troops and veterans.

In 2012, the Senate Health, Education, Labor and Pension Committee investigation revealed the deceptive practices some for-profit colleges use to recruit troops and veterans. Recruiters faced significant pressure to attract military veterans; some recruiters were found to falsely promise that veterans and military benefits would cover the full cost of school. Others published military-themed websites, such as GIBill.com, to push troops and veterans toward for-profit colleges.

This report helped jumpstart an effort among some Congressional lawmakers and military and veterans' groups to have military and veteran benefits included in the 90–10 cap. Many members of Congress, including Representative Jackie Speier and Senators Dick Durbin, Tom Carper, and Richard Blumenthal introduced legislation to close this "loophole". None of these efforts succeeded.

The push to include military and veteran benefits in the 90–10 cap garnered fierce opposition from the for-profit school industry group Career Education Colleges and Universities, previously known as the Association of Private Sector Colleges and Universities.

Many proprietary colleges receive more than 90% of their revenue from federal sources if military and veteran benefits are included in the calculation. A 2014 report from the Center for Investigative Reporting showed that more than 133 schools would fail the 90–10 rule if military and veteran benefits were included.

Efforts to make this change continue. In 2015, Durbin introduced legislation to include military and veteran benefits in the 90–10 cap. The bill remains stuck in the Senate Health, Education, Labor and Pension Committee. President Barack Obama expressed support for the bill shortly after its introduction.

In 2015, Secretary Hillary Clinton expressed support for including military and veteran education benefits in the 90% cap.

=== Reducing the cap to 85–15 ===
Some lawmakers are also trying to lower the percentage of revenue a for-profit school can receive from federal funds from 90% to 85%. If military and veteran benefits were included in this lower cap, the Center for Investigative Reporting found that an additional 292 schools would fail the standard.

The change was included in the stalled Protecting Our Students and Taxpayers Act of 2015, introduced by Senators Durbin, Blumenthal, Jack Reed, and Elizabeth Warren. In his 2017 budget proposal, President Obama requested that the cap be lowered from 90% to 85%.
