= The End of College =

- Author: Kevin Carey
- Subject: Higher education
- Published: March 3, 2015 (Riverhead Books)
- Pages: 288
- ISBN: 9781101634592

The End of College: Creating the Future of Learning and the University of Everywhere is a book by higher education writer and policy analyst Kevin Carey about the future of higher education.

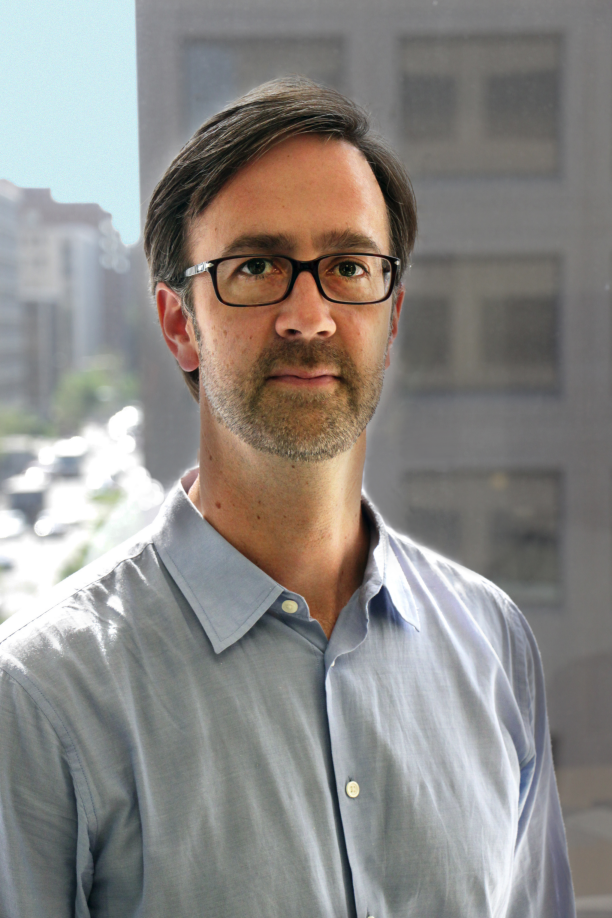
The author, Kevin Carey, in 2014

Carey discusses the premise of his book in 2015
