= Maya Horgan Famodu =

Nigerian-American entrepreneur

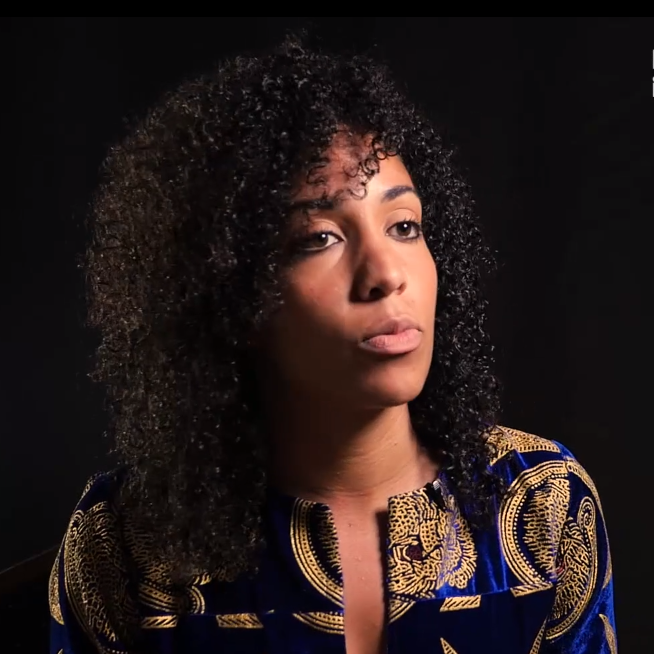
- in 2018
- Born: March 24, 1991 (age 35)
- Citizenship: Nigerian; American
- Education: Pomona College; Cornell University
- Occupation: Entrepreneur

Maya Horgan Famodu is a Nigerian-American entrepreneur, founder and partner at Ingressive, a firm that provides services for firms and businesses expanding into Africa. She also founded Ingressive Capital, a venture capital fund investing in Africa-based technology companies. She co-founded the High Growth Africa Summit, a conference on launching a successful business in Africa, and founded Tech Meets Entertainment Summit, for African celebrities and tech companies to build revenue-generating partnerships. Maya (with her colleagues, Sean Burrowes and Blessing Abeng) later co-founded Ingressive for Good, a nonprofit providing scholarships, technical training and talent placement for African youths.

== Early life and education ==
Famodu has a Nigerian father and an American mother. She spent most of her youth in Minnesota. She attended Pomona College and graduated with a Bachelor of Arts degree in environmental sciences and completed a Pre-law Program at Cornell University.

== Career ==
After her graduation, Horgan Famodu worked at JPMorgan Chase, before starting Ingressive in 2014 and Ingressive Capital in 2017. She started Ingressive Capital as a result of challenges faced by her friends in getting financial support for their businesses. Ingressive Campus Ambassador (ICA) program is another initiative of Ingressive in tertiary institutions within Nigeria, Kenya, Ghana, South Africa, Rwanda and Congo that provides funding, resources and mentorship to computer science students. The program has hubs in the University of Port Harcourt, University of Uyo, Kwara State Polytechnic, Ladoke Akintola University of Technology, Babcock University, Rivers State University, Cross River University of Technology, Federal University of Petroleum Resources Effurun, University of Benin and was launched in Ghana in 2018. In 2016, she co-founded High Growth Africa Summit, a conference on launching a successful business in Africa.

== Awards and recognition ==
Horgan Famodu appeared on the Forbes Africa 30 Under 30 in 2018 in the technology category.

Maya was awarded Forbes 30 Under 30 2021 for the United States Venture Capital category.

== Personal life ==
Maya loves to ride her motorcycle, travel, dancing and choreography. She was a blogger with the Huffington Post from 2012 to 2015.

She is into various sports including CrossFit, and won the 2024 Nigeria Crossfit Wild West Throwdown competition with her partner, Blessing Adesiyan.
