= The Princeton Review =

College admission services company

- Type: Private
- Industry: Education
- Founded: 1981
- Founder: John Katzman; Adam Robinson
- Headquarters: New York City
- Key people: Robert Batten, CEO
- Owner: Primavera Capital Group
- Divisions: College, Business School, Law School, Grad School, Med School
- Subsidiaries: Tutor.com
- Website: princetonreview.com

The Princeton Review is an education services company providing tutoring, test preparation and admission resources for students. It was founded in 1981, and since that time has worked with over 400 million students. Services are delivered by 4,000+ tutors and teachers in the United States, Canada and international offices in 21 countries.; online resources; more than 150 print and digital books published by Penguin Random House; and dozens of categories of school rankings. The Princeton Review's affiliate division, Tutor.com, provides online tutoring services. The Princeton Review is headquartered in New York City and is privately held. The Princeton Review is not associated with Princeton University.

== Corporate history ==
The Princeton Review was founded in 1981 by John Katzman, who—shortly after graduating from Princeton University—began tutoring students for the SAT from his Upper West Side apartment. A short time later, Katzman teamed up with Adam Robinson, an Oxford-trained SAT tutor who had developed a series of techniques for "cracking the system." Katzman built the Princeton Review into a national and then international operation and was CEO until 2007, when he was replaced by Michael Perik.

In March 2010, Perik resigned and was replaced by John M. Connolly. In April 2010, the company sold $48 million in stock for $3 per share, and a short time later was accused of fraud in a class action suit filed by a Michigan retirement fund, which claimed The Princeton Review leadership exaggerated earnings to boost its stock price. In 2012, the company was acquired by Charlesbank Capital, a private equity fund, for $33 million. On August 1, 2014, the Princeton Review brand name and operations were bought for an undisclosed sum by Tutor.com, an IAC company, and Mandy Ginsburg became CEO. The company is no longer affiliated with its former parent, Education Holdings 1, Inc. after they filed for Chapter 11 bankruptcy in 2013. On March 31, 2017, ST Unitas acquired The Princeton Review for an undisclosed sum. In January 2022, Primavera Capital Group acquired The Princeton Review and Tutor.com from ST Unitas.

== Test preparation ==
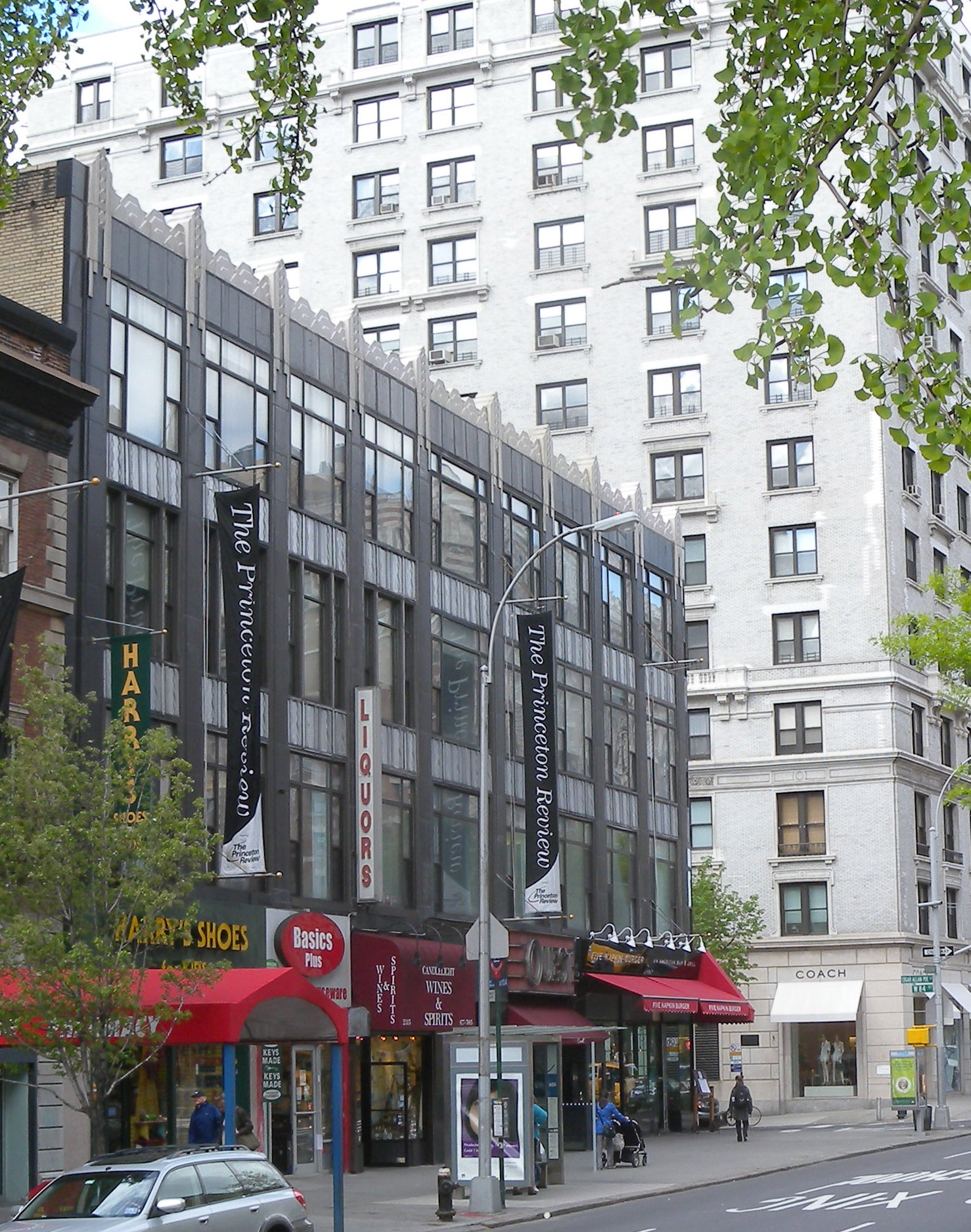
School on Broadway

The Princeton Review offers test preparation courses, tutoring services, and or guidebooks for various tests via the Princeton Review website:

- ACT
- Advanced Placement Exams (AP Exams)
- Chartered Financial Analyst (CFA® Level I)
- Chartered Financial Analyst (CFA® Level II)
- Dental Admission Test (DAT)
- GED
- Graduate Management Admission Test (GMAT)
- Graduate Record Examination (GRE)
- ISEE
- Law School Admissions Test (LSAT)
- Medical College Admission Test (MCAT)
- NCLEX-RN
- Optometry Admission Test (OAT)
- PSAT
- SAT
- Secondary School Admission Test
- SHSAT
- TOEFL
- United States Medical Licensing Examination

The company offers courses worldwide through company-owned and third-party franchises. Countries with Princeton Review franchises include Azerbaijan, Bahrain, Egypt, Hong Kong, India, Indonesia, Jordan, Kazakhstan, Kuwait, Lebanon, Malaysia, Mexico, Oman, Philippines, Qatar, Saudi Arabia, South Korea, Switzerland, Turkey, the United Arab Emirates and Vietnam.

== Legal issues ==
=== False Claims Act settlement (2012) ===
In December 2012, Education Holdings, Inc.—which operated The Princeton Review from 2002 to 2012—settled a lawsuit brought by the U.S. government under the False Claims Act. The lawsuit alleged that the company submitted false claims for federally funded tutoring services provided to students in underperforming New York City public schools through the Supplemental Educational Services (SES) program. Education Holdings admitted that its employees had falsified attendance records between 2006 and 2010 in order to receive payments for services that were not actually provided.

According to the U.S. Department of Justice, Site Managers frequently forged student signatures, and were pressured by supervisors to meet attendance quotas. Directors received bonuses based on inflated attendance rates, creating systemic incentives for fraud. The government joined a whistleblower lawsuit previously filed under the False Claims Act and ultimately reached a settlement requiring Education Holdings to pay up to $10 million in damages and penalties. Education Holdings also voluntarily agreed to a three-year exclusion from all federal education funding programs. At the time of the settlement, the company had already sold The Princeton Review brand and name to an unrelated third party in May 2012.

=== Criminal and civil proceedings (2013) ===
Following the 2012 settlement, the U.S. Attorney’s Office for the Southern District of New York announced a number of civil and criminal actions against individuals involved in the fraudulent SES reimbursement scheme. Ana Azocar and Zorayma Azocar, former Site Managers and later Directors of The Princeton Review’s SES program in New York City, pled guilty to fraud charges and settled civil claims brought against them. Zorayma Azocar entered her plea on January 11, 2013, and Ana Azocar on January 15, 2013. Robert Stephen Green, a former Director and Vice President of The Princeton Review, also settled civil claims related to the same scheme.

=== Student data breach lawsuit ===
The Princeton Review was also involved in a class action lawsuit after the personal data—including Social Security numbers—of students was inadvertently made publicly accessible on its website. The law firm Shapiro Haber & Urmy LLP represented a class of affected students and alleged claims of negligence, breach of contract, and unfair trade practices. A settlement was reached in which the company agreed to provide identity protection services, including credit monitoring and identity theft insurance, for up to three years.

== Criticisms ==
=== Criticism of school rankings ===
College rankings, including those published by the Princeton Review, have been criticized for failing to be accurate or comprehensive by assigning objective rankings formed from subjective opinions. Princeton Review officials counter that their rankings are unique in that they rely on student opinion and not just on statistical data.

In 2002 an American Medical Association affiliated program, A Matter of Degree, funded by the Robert Wood Johnson Foundation, criticized the Princeton Review list of Best Party Schools. USA Today published an editorial titled "Sobering Statistics" in August 2002 and stated, "the doctor's group goes too far in suggesting that the rankings contribute to the problem (of campus drinking)." The editorial noted the fact that among the schools the AMA program was then funding as part of its campaign against campus drinking, six of 10 of those schools calling for The Princeton Review to "drop the annual ranking...had made (Princeton Review's) past top-party-school lists: many times for some. That's no coincidence." The editorial commended The Princeton Review for reporting the list, calling it "a public service" for "student applicants and their parents".

The Princeton Review rankings for LGBT-related lists were criticized in 2010 by a ranking competitor in The Advocate magazine as inaccurate due to outdated methodologies. The Princeton Review has always based its "LGBTQ-Friendly" and "LGBTQ-Unfriendly" top twenty ranking lists on its tri-annual surveys of students at colleges profiled in the company's Best Colleges book which asks undergraduates: "Do students, faculty, and administrators at your college treat all persons equally regardless of their sexual orientations and gender identify/expression?" The Princeton Review also publishes The Gay & Lesbian Guide to College Life (2007). It has been available as an eBook since 2011.

=== Privacy concerns ===
In 2016, the company was criticized by privacy rights advocates concerned that a company that owns online dating and college preparation services could amass data and exploit it in a way that preys on unsuspecting consumers, particularly younger people. "Do parents know that when their underage kids enroll for exam prep or tutoring, personal information may be shared with hookup sites that could then target their kids to become customers?" asked the critic, who concluded that the company "makes no guarantee that data sharing among its entities will not include those customers whose sole aim is to improve their grades and test scores." Indeed, another critic points out that The Princeton Review "policy states 'we may collect certain information from your computer each time you visit our site'—information like data 'regarding your academic and extracurricular activities and interests.' That information can be used to 'send you email notices and offers; perform research and analysis about your use of or interest in our products, services or products or services offered by others; [and] develop and display content and advertising tailored to your interests on our site and other sites.'"

No evidence was ever presented that IAC, which owned The Princeton Review when these criticisms were made, used data gathered by The Princeton Review to promote IAC company dating services to younger people.

== See also ==
- Storefront school
