= 2U (company) =

American education technology company

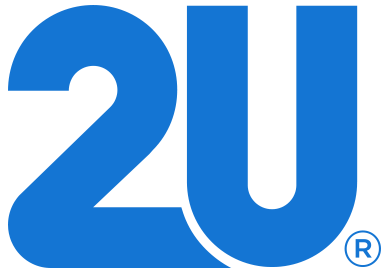
- Formerly: 2Tor (2008–2012)
- Type: Private
- Founded: 2008; 18 years ago
- Founders: John Katzman; Jeremy Johnson; Christopher J. Paucek
- Headquarters: Arlington, Virginia, U.S.
- Area served: Global
- Key people: Brian Napack (executive chairman); Kees Bol (CEO)
- Services: Educational technology; Online program manager
- Number of employees: 2,961 (2022)
- Subsidiaries: edX; GetSmarter Online
- Website: 2u.com

2U is an American educational technology company that contracts with non-profit colleges, universities, and companies to build, deliver, and support online degree and non-degree programs. 2U is the parent company of edX.

== History ==
=== 2008-2016: Early history ===
2U was founded in 2008 by John Katzman. The company was originally named 2tor (pronounced "Tutor"). Katzman recruited Chip Paucek, and technology entrepreneur Jeremy Johnson to be co-founders. Katzman was the CEO through 2012, when he became chairman and appointed Paucek as CEO.

Katzman funded 2U in 2009 through the launch of its first online teaching degree with the University of Southern California. In 2010, 2U partnered again with USC to offer an online degree in social work.

In 2011, Georgetown University's School of Nursing and Health partnered with 2U to offer a degree program. The Kenan-Flagler Business School at the University of North Carolina started offering an online MBA through 2U the same year. In March 2011, the company raised a $32.5 million Series C, bringing its total funding to $65 million.

In February 2014, 2U announced that Sallie Krawcheck, a former executive at Bank of America and Citigroup, and Earl Lewis, president of the Andrew W. Mellon Foundation, added to the company's board. On March 28, 2U went public and raised $119 million by offering 9.2 million shares at $13 per share; its ticker symbol was "TWOU". By July, other schools such as Syracuse University, Northwestern University, and the University of California, Berkeley signed on with 2U to create online graduate degree programs.

In March 2015, Yale University and 2U announced that they were partnering in order to offer a full-time, online master of medical science degree. By 2015, about 12,300 students were enrolled in 2U partner programs.

=== 2017-2020: Growth through acquisition ===
Starting in 2017, 2U diversified its strategy and acquired education companies GetSmarter, and later Trilogy Education, firms offering short-term non-credit training programs. In 2017, Paucek earned an MBA online from the University of North Carolina at Chapel Hill, through the school's partnership with 2U. In late 2017, former Obama administration official Valerie Jarrett joined 2U's board.

In 2018, 2U launched the Harvard Business Analytics Program in conjunction with Harvard University. Students in this program had an average of 17.5 years of work experience, were an average of 42 years old, and paid $50,000 in tuition.

In early 2019, 2U announced that it had entered a partnership with EGADE Business School at Tecnológico de Monterrey in Mexico to offer an online MBA program. 2U also partnered with Tecnológico de Monterrey and the Washington University School of Law to offer an online master of laws program. On August 6, 2U announced its first undergraduate program, offering a degree in data science and business analytics, as well as six other degrees, from the University of London (UoL), with its member institution London School of Economics (LSE). UoL, LSE and 2U planned to keep the cost of the three-year degree at $26,000, far lower than most of 2U's other programs. In September, 2U created a "Framework for Transparency", with a commitment to publishing transparent data on topics including university oversight and accountability, access, quality and outcomes.

In 2020, Senators Elizabeth Warren and Sherrod Brown called for 2U and four other online program managers to disclose the terms of their contracts with colleges and universities to determine whether they were compliant with consumer protection laws. In June, 2U announced that it would offer $3 million in scholarships in increments of $2,500 to underrepresented demographics, and the recipients would have to demonstrate both need and merit. The scholarships could be applied to about 100 different programs with a strong emphasis on technical training. Later that year, 2U announced a partnership with Netflix and Norfolk State University to offer free online tech bootcamps to current students and alumni. In November, 2U published its first transparency report, which showed it had invested $1.3B in its non-profit partners' degree programs, and 72% of students graduate from those programs.

=== 2020-present: Reorganization ===
2U strongly benefited from the shift to online learning brought on by the response to COVID-19, with a large growth in gross revenue in 2020. The company also reduced its debt. 2U was servicing more than 275,000 students as of late 2020. 2U said that the pandemic also increased interest in its revenue-sharing pricing model from new and existing clients. Also in 2020, the London School of Economics agreed to expand its scope business with 2U to include two additional undergraduate degrees in mathematics and finance. In September, 2U and Columbia University's engineering school announced an expansion of their work together, where 2U would help launch the Columbia Artificial Intelligence Program, an online program targeted at working executives.

Before the start of the 2020–2021 academic year, Boston, Massachusetts-based Simmons University announced that it would be delivering hundreds of courses online in order to cope with the COVID-19 crisis. The expanded agreement with Simmons also provided for the creation of additional degree programs aimed at non-traditional students, with lower tuition than in-person programs. Simmons received services from 2U on a revenue-share basis.

In February 2021, 2U announced a strategic agreement with education assistance benefits manager Guild Education. The partnership allowed 2U online degrees, boot camps and nondegree certificate programs to become available to employees at companies that are Guild customers, like Walmart, Chipotle, Lowe’s, and the Walt Disney Corporation. The same year, 2U purchased massive open online course (MOOC) provider edX for $800 million cash. Also in June, Netflix and 2U announced an expansion of their boot camps for Talladega College, St. Edward's University, Marymount University, and Edward Waters College.

In October 2021, Valerie Jarrett resigned from the 2U board, noting obligations to other professional responsibilities aside from 2U. In November 2021, an article in The Wall Street Journal alleged that 2U often used aggressive means to recruit students for the University of Southern California’s master’s in social work and that "USC social-work graduates who took out federal loans borrowed a median $112,000. Half of them were earning $52,000 or less annually two years later."

In 2022, the company was criticized for its online program manager contracts in which it licenses its courses, through a revenue-sharing agreement, to participating colleges and for its student recruitment practices.

In 2022, students of USC and 2U sued the entities for allegedly falsifying rankings. A federal judge dismissed the case against 2U.

On May 16, 2022, Bloomberg reported that Indian education tech company Byju's was in talks to acquire 2U, along with fellow American education technology company Chegg. In June 2022, it was reported that Byju's had put forward an offer of more than US$1 billion to acquire 2U. On July 28, 2022, Paucek announced that the company would layoff 20% of its workforce "across the board". In December 2022, a class action suit was filed against 2U and the University of Southern California "defrauded students by using misleading U.S. News & World Report rankings to promote the courses."

In 2023, 2U sued the federal Department of Education for establishing new rules to provide more oversight of third-party servicers. The lawsuit asserted that the department exceeded their authority by bypassing the federal rule-making process by abusing regulatory guidance. The Department of Education rescinded their guidance on third-party services in October of 2024.

On September 28, 2023, then-CEO Chip Paucek announced organizational changes in the company that would require more layoffs.

On November 9, 2023, USC and 2U announced a mutual decision to end the majority of its programs, including the social work program. 2U shares dropped 57 percent that day.

On November 17, 2023, Paul Lalljie, 2U's CFO, replaced Chip Paucek as CEO. 2U's chief legal officer Matt Norden became CFO. On January 3, 2024, chief revenue officer Harsha Mokkarala resigned. Andrew Hermalyn was appointed president of the degree program segment and Aaron McCullough was appointed president of the alternative credential segment.

As of 2023, 2U's largest outside shareholder was ARK Invest. As of 2023, 2U had never made an annual profit.

On July 25, 2024, 2U filed for Chapter 11 bankruptcy protection which eliminated over $450 million of debt. As of 2024, the company planned to continue operating as a private company.

On October 4, 2024, Paul Lalljie stepped down as 2U's CEO. Matt Norden then served as interim CEO until January 27, 2025, when Kees Bol assumed the role.

In December 2025, 2U partnered with the University of Oxford's Faculty of Law, hosting courses from the law school on the platform. Prior to this, 2U already held partnerships with Oxford's Blavatnik School of Government and Saïd Business School.

In April 2026, 2U refinanced its credit agreements and obtained additional capital from its ownership group.

== Operations ==
2U has operated as an online program manager. As of 2026, 2U had about 250 clients including Ivy League schools such as Harvard University, public universities like University of California, Berkeley, and international schools, like the University of Oxford. Students pay standard tuition as set by the partner university.

=== Subsidiaries ===
==== GetSmarter ====
GetSmarter was founded in Cape Town, South Africa in 2008 by the Paddock family. Sam Paddock and his brother Robert were the principal founders. The brothers' father Graham and their mother were also involved in GetSmarter's early days. Graham worked as a real estate lawyer; He found traveling to train property managers excessively burdensome and created online property law courses to reduce his workload. Sam Paddock led a previous venture called GETWINE, an online wine seller, that also offered a popular wine appreciation course developed with Charl Theron from Stellenbosch University's department of viticulture and oenology.

GetSmarter’s business model focused on offering online short courses in partnership with universities and industry experts to working professionals. The company started with just five employees; the Paddocks funded payroll with revenue from their other business. The company soon entered a period of rapid growth.

By 2012, GetSmarter had R20 million in annual revenue. By 2015, revenue had increase to R128 million. GetSmarter was able to achieve a year-on-year growth rate up to 100%. This was partially a reflection of the rapidly expanding market for online education. In 2016, the company's headcount reached 400 employees including tutors, performance coaches, tech staff, and video producers; The company had also served about 50,000 students since its founding. In 2016, GetSmarter's revenue was about R227 million. That year the company obtained $5 million in funding from Digital Growth Africa Middle East (DiGAME), a subsidiary of Zouk Capital. Even after this investment GetSmarter was still able to grow by reinvesting its profits.

As of 2017, notable partners had included Cambridge, Harvard, the Massachusetts Institute of Technology (MIT), Harvard, the University of the Witwatersrand, the University of Cape Town, and the business school at Stellenbosch University. With its partner schools GetSmarter was offering 70 continuing education courses such as a 10-week HarvardX course called "Global Health and Delivery." These courses served students in about 150 countries. The company operated out of dual headquarters in London and Cape Town.

In 2017, GetSmarter Online was acquired by 2U, an educational technology company based in the United States, for $103 million. The deal included a $20 million earn-out contingent on financial performance. The deal was announced on 2 May 2017 and closed on 3 July the same year. The transaction was all cash due to South African regulations. Post-acquisition GetSmarter continued to operate independently.

GetSmarter was 2U's first acquisition. 2U found the similarity of the two companies' business models to be a key selling point. This transaction also offered 2U very fast international expansion and an entry point into short courses.

==== edX ====
In 2021, 2U announced it would purchase edX, a platform created by MIT and Harvard in 2012. edX has since grown to offer other credentials such as professional certificates, MicroMasters, and MicroBachelors.

== Recognition ==
In May 2012, Forbes named 2U one of the ten "Start-Ups Changing the World".

In 2014, Inc. Magazine named 2U one of ten "Tech Companies Helping Humanity".

In 2017 and 2022, 2U was listed as a "Most Innovative Company" by Fast Company.

== See also ==
- For-profit higher education in the United States
