= Itana =

Charter city in Nigeria

- Type: Private
- Industry: Technology, Real estate
- Founded: 2022
- Founders: Iyinoluwa Aboyeji; Luqman Edu (CEO); Coco Liu (COO)
- Website: https://www.itana.africa/

Itana (originally founded as Talent City) is a Nigeria-based company building the first Digital Free Zone in Africa. It enables businesses to operate and function in Nigeria, and Africa without being physically present in the country. The name "Itana" is derived from the word "Itanna" which means "kindling of a fire" in Yoruba language. Itana is currently in its beta stage and plans to go live in the first quarter of 2024.

== History ==
In January 2020, Iyinoluwa Aboyeji announced that he and his team are building a futuristic city to support the digital economy.

In August 2020, The Government of Nigeria announced her intention to work with Future Africa in deploying technology to ignite interests and collaboration in the country's free trade zones.

In January 2022, Itana acquired its first physical location - a 72,000 sqm plot in Alaro City, Lekki Free Zone, Lagos Nigeria. The emerging city is expected to be home to 1,000 residents and 2,500 remote workers.

In 2023, the company raised USD 2 million in a pre-seed round from LocalGlobe, Amplo, Pronomos Capital, and Future Africa.

== Community and infrastructure ==
Itana has launched a digital residency program to bring together startup founders and operators to build for Africa. The Itana District is set to be a live-work-build environment on a 72,000 sqm plot in Alaro City, Lagos, Nigeria.

== Investors and partnership ==
Itana is supported by the Nigerian government through the Nigeria Export Processing Authority (NEPZA). LocalGlobe, Amplo, Pronomos Capital, and Future Africa are investors in Itana.
