= Thomas Blanchard Stowell =

American educator and researcher

Thomas Blanchard Stowell (1846–1927) was an American educator.

Stowell was born on March 29, 1846, in Perry, New York. In 1865, at the age of 19, he graduated from Genesee College (now Syracuse University). He went on to earn a Master's degree in 1868 and a Ph.D. in 1881 from the same institution.

After graduating from college in 1865, he became principal of the Addison Academy in Addison, New York. One year later, he was in charge of the Academic Department of the Union School in Morrisville, New York. The next year he was a professor of mathematics at Genesee Wesleyan Seminary. The year after he was principal of Morris High School in Leavenworth, Kansas.

In 1869 Stowell became the Chair of Natural Sciences at the new (founded 1868) Cortland State Normal School in Cortland, New York, now known as the State University of New York at Cortland. After having just held four jobs in four years, he stayed at Cortland for 20 years.

Stowell left Cortland in 1889 to become the principal of the Potsdam Normal School in Potsdam, New York, now known as the State University of New York at Potsdam. He remained at Potsdam for another 20 years. In 1909 he was awarded an honorary LL.D. from St. Lawrence University in Canton, New York.

In 1909 Stowell left Potsdam to become the founding chair of the new Department of Education in the College of Liberal Arts at the University of Southern California (USC). In 1918 USC established its School of Education, and Stowell became the founding dean of the school.

In addition to his administrative roles, Stowell was also an accomplished scientist. His work included the fields of human and comparative anatomy, microscopy, and comparative neurology. He was a fellow of the American Association for the Advancement of Science; a charter member of the Association of American Anatomists and a member of their nomenclature committee; and a member of the Microscopy Society of America and American History Association. Stowell was particularly known for his pamphlets on the origin and cranial nerves of the domestic cat. In 1891 he was a contributor to Volume 1 of The Journal of Comparative Neurology.

Thomas Blanchard Stowell retired in 1919 after a career of 54 years in education. The University of Southern California named the Thomas Blanchard Stowell Hall of Education and Stowell Research Library in his honor. In 1963 SUNY Potsdam named its Stowell Hall in his honor.
