= Randy Best =

American businessman

- Education: Lamar University

Randy Best is an American education entrepreneur and conservative political donor.

== Early life ==
Best was born and raised in Beaumont, Texas, the son of a hardware store owner and a teacher. In 1967, Best graduated from Lamar University, where he majored in political science after switching from pre-law.

== Career ==
While a student at Lamar, Best started a jewelry business which he later sold for $12 million. After selling the business, Best pursued several different ventures, including art galleries, clinics, cattle yards, oil and gas, defense and aerospace, and Girl Scout-cookie manufacturing. Best and Elvis Mason founded a bank in 1984 with the backing of Robert S. Strauss, Laurence Tisch, and Thomas C. Barry. In 1995, Best founded Voyager Expanded Learning, a phonics-based early-literacy curriculum. By 2005, more than a thousand school districts across the United States used the Voyager curriculum. Best sold Voyager in the mid-2000s, and founded Academic Partnerships, which provides master's degree programs in business and education to public colleges. Academic Partnerships first worked with Lamar University to establish an online program, then expanded to several other universities including the University of Texas system and Arkansas State University. Best hired former Florida Governor Jeb Bush as an adviser to Academic Partnerships, and the two co-wrote a 2013 Inside Higher Ed op-ed promoting online education.

Best has served on the boards of Best Associates, ProQuest, Voyager Learning Company, Mason Best, the Education Commission of the States, the NEA Foundation, the National Urban Alliance Board of Columbia University, the Smithsonian Institution, and the National Foundation For The Improvement of Education. Best was a major bundler for Jeb Bush's 2016 run for president.

== Other activities ==
Best donated money to George W. Bush's successful 1998 campaign for re-election as Governor of Texas, and was a major donor to Bush's 2000 run for president.
