= Tennessee Promise =

Higher educational program in Tennessee, United States

The Tennessee Promise, administered by the Tennessee Student Assistance Corporation, is a last-dollar scholarship and mentorship program available for Tennessee's high school graduates to attend two years of secondary education. This program began as a component of Governor Bill Haslam's "Drive to 55" initiative, which set the statewide goal of 55% of Tennesseans possessing a college degree or certificate by 2025. Tennessee (TN) Promise recipients are able to use their scholarship at any of Tennessee's 13 community colleges and 27 colleges of applied technology.

== History ==
In 2008, Knox County Mayor Mike Ragsdale approached then Knoxville Mayor Bill Haslam with a non-profit organization that would cover gaps in tuition coverage at community colleges and technical schools for local high school students. KnoxAchieves, a non-profit dedicated to providing a last-dollar scholarship and mentorship program for low-income incoming college freshman, was initiated in Knox County in 2008 and later expanded to the statewide program TnAchieves. In May 2014, legislation passed creating the TN Promise scholarship and mentorship program based upon these previous initiatives; as a last-dollar scholarship, TN Promise covers all tuition and fees which exceed the student's previously granted scholarships and aid such as the Tennessee HOPE Scholarship and the Federal Pell grant. The first cohort of the program began their classes in fall 2015. The increase in attendance at Tennessee's two-year institutions as a result of TN Promise is estimated to be on average 40%.

The TN Promise program received nationwide attention with the states of Oregon, Rhode Island, and New York since creating similar programs. In 2015, President Barack Obama visited east Tennessee's Pellissippi State Community College to promote affordable higher education initiatives, notably America's College Promise, a nationwide program based on TN Promise. More recently in fall 2020, the University of Tennessee began UT Promise which provides free tuition for students with household incomes of less than $50,000 per year.
