= Kent M. Keith =

American writer and leader in higher education (born 1949)

- Born: 1949 (age 76–77) New York City, U.S.
- Occupation: Writer
- Education: Harvard College; University of Hawaiʻi at Mānoa (JD); USC Rossier School of Education (EdD) Oriel College, University of Oxford
- Spouse: Elizabeth Keith
- Children: 3

Kent M. Keith (born in 1949 in Brooklyn) is an American writer and leader in higher education.

Raised in Nebraska, California, Virginia, Rhode Island and Hawaii, where he graduated from secondary school, Keith entered Harvard College to study government. After graduating, he read philosophy and politics at the University of Oxford as a Rhodes Scholar, received his J.D. degree at Richardson School of Law at the University of Hawaiʻi at Mānoa, and earned an Ed. D. from the Rossier School of Education at the University of Southern California.

His early career was as an attorney with Cades Schutte Fleming & Wright and then as Director of the State of Hawaii Department of Planning and Economic Development. He was the President of Chaminade University from 1989 to 1995 and was then the Senior Vice President for the YMCA of Honolulu. From 2007 to 2012 he was CEO of the Greenleaf Center for Servant Leadership (US), and from 2012 to 2015 he was CEO of the Greenleaf Centre for Servant Leadership (Asia) based in Singapore. In 2015, he became president of Pacific Rim Christian University in Honolulu.

== The Paradoxical Commandments ==
The Paradoxical Commandments is both a poem and a book by Keith, which he wrote as an undergraduate. It is often found in slightly altered form.

In 1997, Keith learned that the poem "The Paradoxical Commandments" had hung on the wall of Mother Teresa's children's home in Calcutta, India; and, two decades after writing the original poem, Dr. Keith wrote a book of the same title expanding on the themes of the poem: Anyway: The Paradoxical Commandments: Finding Personal Meaning in a Crazy World.

The Paradoxical Commandments

People are illogical, unreasonable, and self-centered.
Love them anyway.
If you do good, people will accuse you of selfish ulterior motives.
Do good anyway.
If you are successful, you will win false friends and true enemies.
Succeed anyway.
The good you do today will be forgotten tomorrow.
Do good anyway.
Honesty and frankness make you vulnerable.
Be honest and frank anyway.
The biggest men and women with the biggest ideas can be shot down by the smallest men and women with the smallest minds.
Think big anyway.
People favor underdogs but follow only top dogs.
Fight for a few underdogs anyway.
What you spend years building may be destroyed overnight.
Build anyway.
People really need help but may attack you if you do help them.
Help people anyway.
Give the world the best you have and you'll get kicked in the teeth.
Give the world the best you have anyway.

== Publications ==
- The Silent Revolution: Dynamic Leadership in the Student council, Harvard Student Agencies, 1968 (republished by National Association of Secondary School Principals, 1972).
- The Silent Majority: The Problem of Apathy and the Student Council, National Association of Secondary School Principals, 1971.
- An Ethic for Ocean Resource Development, 1981.
- Nukolii and Hawaii's Future, 1983.
- The Paradoxical Commandments: Finding Personal Meaning in a Crazy World, Inner Ocean Publishing, 2001.
- Anyway: The Paradoxical Commandments: Finding Personal Meaning in a Crazy World, G. P. Putnam's Sons, 2002.
- Do It Anyway: The Handbook for Finding Personal Meaning and Deep Happiness in a Crazy World, New World Library, 2003.
- Jesus Did It Anyway: The Paradoxical Commandments for Christians, Berkley, 2005.
- Nine University Presidents who Saved Their Institutions: The Difference in Effective Administration, Edwin Mellen Press, 2008.
- Do It Anyway: Finding Personal Meaning and Deep Happiness by Living the Paradoxical Commandments, New World Library, 2008.
- Have Faith Anyway: The Vision of Habakkuk for Our Times, Jossey-Bass, 2008.
- The Case for Servant Leadership, Terrace Press, 2012.
- Morality and Morale: A Business Tale, Terrace Press, 2012.
- Questions and Answers about Servant Leadership, Greenleaf Center, 2012.
- Servant Leadership in the Boardroom: Fulfilling the Public Trust, Greenleaf Center, 2013
- The Ethical Advantage of Servant Leadership: Guiding Principles for Organizational Success, Greenleaf Center, 2013.
- The Christian Leader at Work: Serving by Leading, Terrace Press (Honolulu, Hawaii), 2015.

== Personal life ==
He lives with his wife, Elizabeth Keith, and three children in Honolulu, Hawaii.
