= Ingressive for Good =

African non-profit organization

- Founded: 2020
- Type: Nonprofit organization; Non-governmental organization
- Region served: Africa
- Key people: Maya Horgan Famodu; Blessing Abeng; Sean Burrowes
- Website: https://www.ingressive.org

Ingressive for Good also known as I4G is an African non-profit organization that focuses on poverty alleviation by providing educational and technological resources to young Africans.

== History and operations ==
Ingressive for Good was founded in 2020 by Sean Burrowes, Maya Horgan-Famodu, and Blessing Abeng.

The organization collaborates with training institutions like Coursera, DataCamp, Meta, and others to provide learning modules for the development of its community members. The organization is backed by Google's parent company, Alphabet and has trained 132,000 students in coding and technology skills. Ingressive for Good has also been recognized for its impact in the African tech ecosystem, as one of the leading nonprofits.

== Vision and mission ==
I4G's vision as stated in the company's official website is to increase the earning power of African youths by empowering them with tech skills, resources, community, and opportunities. It offers support to African youths by providing scholarships and educational opportunities in technology skills.

I4G provides partial scholarships to financially disadvantaged final year students in the field of technology, with the aim of facilitating their admission to prestigious educational institutions in Africa, often referred to as the Ivy Leagues of the continent. In addition to financial assistance, this programme also offers a laptop to facilitate the student's learning activities. Upon being awarded this scholarship, each student will be granted membership into the I4G Alumni.
