= John Katzman =

American businessman (born 1959)

- Born: October 10, 1959 (age 67); New York City, New York, U.S.
- Education: Birch Wathen School
- Alma mater: Princeton University (A.B.)
- Occupations: CEO, The Noodle Companies
- Spouse: Alicia Ernst
- Children: Daniel and Lyra

John Katzman (born October 10, 1959) is an American EdTech pioneer. He founded and ran Princeton Review, which assists students with their studies and career choices, and then founded and ran 2U and Noodle Partners, both of which use are tech-enabled service providers to universities. Katzman has also authored books on those subjects.

== Early life ==
Katzman was born in New York City in 1959, and grew up there with brother Richard, and sister, Julie. Katzman went to Birch Wathen, a small independent school, from kindergarten through high school. He attended Princeton University, where he majored in electrical engineering and computer science (EECS) and then switched to the school of Architecture. He started tutoring in sophomore year to pay his expenses, and continued through college. Katzman graduated from Princeton University with an A.B. in architecture in 1981 after completing a senior thesis titled "The Dead Tree Gives No Shelter."

== Career ==
The Princeton Review (1981-2007)

Katzman was the co-founder of The Princeton Review, which initially taught SAT preparation to high-school students in New York City. He started the company in 1981 shortly after leaving college, then partnered with Adam Robinson to develop it, and served as the company’s CEO until 2007. He authored and coauthored a number of books for the company, including Cracking the SAT, a New York Times bestseller, and created products and services in several media.

2U (2008-2012)

In 2008, Katzman founded 2U, an educational technology company that partners with leading nonprofit colleges and universities, such as the University of Southern California, Georgetown University, and University of North Carolina at Chapel Hill to offer online degree programs. He served as the company’s CEO until January 2012. Katzman shifted to Executive Chairman in January 2012, and left in August to help build Noodle. Like The Princeton Review, 2U became a Russell 2000 company.

Noodle (2010–present)

In 2010, Katzman created The Noodle Companies, a studio with multiple subsidiary, Noodle-branded education companies.

In 2016, he changed the focus of Noodle Partners, and became its full time CEO. Founded as an online program manager, Noodle Partners has evolved into a full-service strategy, marketing, and technical services provider to higher education. As of October 2023, it reported working with over 65 public and private universities and has raised over $110 million through three rounds of financing.

== Other interests ==
Katzman has been involved in the founding of several other education companies, including Tutor.com, Student Advantage, and Eat New York, an early software-based restaurant guide. He is an angel investor in two dozen education technology ventures, and has served on the boards or advisory boards of several others including the National Association of Independent Schools, the National Alliance of Public Charter Schools, The Institute for Citizens & Scholars, Carnegie Learning, and Renaissance Learning.

== Issue advocacy ==
Despite being the founder of a business based on the preparation of students for a wide range of standardized tests, Katzman is an outspoken critic of the modern preoccupation with standardized testing. He has argued that many tests are no better indicator of achievement in the relevant fields than grades and scores on other tests (such as the Advanced Placement exams). He has also been outspoken in his opposition to the Common Core and tests based on it. He demands better outcomes from for-profit education providers. He often speaks on topics related to online education and the measurement of academic achievement.

In 2008, Katzman and his wife pledged $1.5 million to help fund the Katzman/Ernst Chair in Educational Entrepreneurship, Technology and Innovation, an endowed chair in the University of Southern California Rossier School of Education to train and certify teachers for urban schools.

== Awards ==
Katzman was a co-recipient of a Cable Television ACE Award in 1995 for Princeton Review's Student Admissions Television, an education special about the SAT. Princeton Review's Inside the SAT software was the recipient of a 1996 software CODiE award.

Katzman was a recipient of the 2018 ASU GSV Lifetime Achievement Award, which "honors individuals whose lives have had a profound impact in changing the world for good". In 2024, he was named one of the 100 most influential people in K-12 education by District Administration.

== Controversy ==
=== Cybersquatting ===
At Princeton Review, Katzman was one of the first cybersquatters on the Internet. In 1994, he registered Kaplan.com, and then taunted that competitor by encouraging visitors to tell their stories about the company on that page. The case went to arbitration, where he offered to sell the domain for a case of beer; Kaplan declined, and was awarded the domain, leading Katzman to state that "The folks at Kaplan have no imagination, no sense of humor and no beer."

=== Online and for-profit education ===
As a founder of both 2U and its major competitor, Noodle Partners, Katzman is often mentioned in articles and discussions surrounding the Online Program Management (OPM) industry. At 2U, Katzman popularized the revenue-share model in which OPMs take a percentage of a university’s tuition revenue in exchange for program management. This business model is debated among higher education constituents and policymakers but remains popular today. A 2019 article by Kevin Carey published in the Huffington Post names Katzman as the impetus for the development of the entire OPM industry and some of the issues that have since arisen, including revenue-share and runaway digital marketing costs. Katzman, Carey says, is now fighting to change the tuition-splitting practices that he created. In 2020, however, Noodle Partners teamed up with Strategic Education to use WorkForceEdge, a platform to connect employees with educational programs. Strategic Education is the parent company of Strayer University and Capella University.

=== Books ===
- Cracking the SAT with Adam Robinson. Villard Books, (1986). ISBN 0-394-74342-3.
- The Best 284 Colleges, with Tom Meltzer and Zach Knower (1992). Current ISBN 0525568425.
- Class Action, with Steven Hodas (1995). ISBN 978-0679434306

=== Essays ===
- Katzman, John. "A Civil Education Marketplace" (May 10, 2016). The State of Entrepreneurship in K–12 Education.
- Lutz, Andy, Katzman, John, and Olsen, Erik (March 1, 2004), "Would Shakespeare Get Into Swarthmore?", The Atlantic.

== Personal ==
Katzman lives in New York and is married to Alicia Ernst. They have two children, Daniel and Lyra.
