= University Alliance (US) =

Coordinates: 27.9786°N 82.3425°W

University Alliance Online (US) was an organization that facilitated the online delivery of associate's, bachelor's and master's degrees as well as professional certificate programs from Villanova University, the University of Notre Dame's Mendoza College of Business, Michigan State University, the University of San Francisco, the University of Vermont, Florida Institute of Technology, The University of Scranton, Jacksonville University, Dominican University, and New England College.
