= Flutterwave =

American fintech company

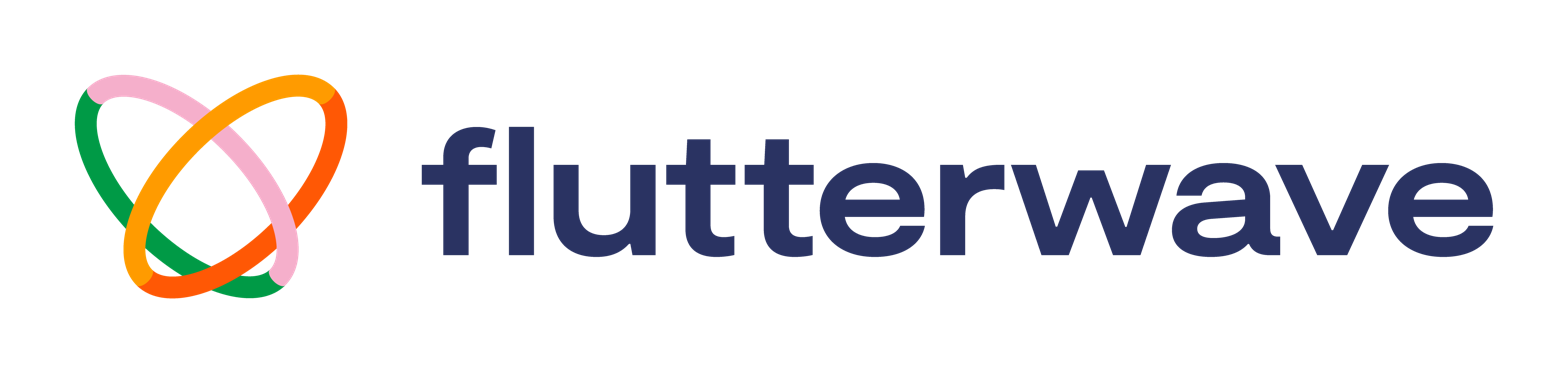
- Type: Private
- Industry: Financial technology
- Founded: 2016
- Founders: Iyinoluwa Aboyeji, Olugbenga Agboola
- Headquarters: San Francisco, California, U.S. Lagos, Nigeria
- Area served: Africa, Europe, North America
- Key people: Olugbenga Agboola
- Products: Payment gateway, APIs, Mobile money, Merchant services
- Services: Online payments, Remittances, Checkout, POS, Virtual cards
- Number of employees: 350+
- Website: www.flutterwave.com

Flutterwave is a fintech company that provides a payment infrastructure for global merchants and payment service providers.

== History ==
Flutterwave was founded in 2016 by Iyinoluwa Aboyeji and Olugbenga Agboola. The company is headquartered in San Francisco, California with current operations in the United States, Canada, Nigeria, Kenya, Uganda, Ghana, South Africa, and 29 other African countries.

In 2021, Flutterwave raised a US$170 million Series C funding round. At the time, this was the largest amount ever secured by an African tech startup and gave it a valuation of over US$1 billion, making Flutterwave a unicorn. Investors in Flutterwave include Y-Combinator, Visa Ventures, Mastercard, Avenir Growth Capital, and Tiger Global Management. Flutterwave raised a US$250 million Series D funding round at over US$3 billion valuation in 2022 as well.

In December 2021, Flutterwave launched Send App, an African-focused remittance service that facilitates instant money transfers, and appointed Wizkid as its global ambassador to further push the company's brand among the Africans in the diaspora. Send App is now available in 29 states in the U.S. and is expected to expand to all 50 states.

In January 2022, Flutterwave partnered with AfroSport Network to broadcast the 2021 Africa Cup of Nations free-to-air from 9 January 2022 to 6 February 2022.

In 2024, Flutterwave announced several developments. In April, the company announced plans for an Initial public offering. That same month, Flutterwave's CEO, Olugbenga Agboola, was named vice chair of the U.S. Chamber of Commerce's US-Africa Business Center board of directors. In June, Flutterwave partnered with Nigeria’s Economic and Financial Crimes Commission (EFCC) to establish and lead a state-of-the-art Cybercrime Research Center. Following this, in July, Flutterwave joined the prestigious Milken Institute's Africa Leaders Business Council. In August, Flutterwave expanded its digital payment services with a license in Ghana, marking the 34th African country where it holds a license.

In January 2026, it was announced that Flutterwave had acquired Mono, a Nigerian open banking infrastructure provider, in an all-stock transaction. Mono, founded in 2020 and headquartered in Lagos, was to continue operating independently following the acquisition, which followed a partnership between the two companies dating back to 2021; financial terms were not formally disclosed. Flutterwave also announced it has partnered with blockchain infrastructure provider Turnkey and artificial intelligence-powered global banking platform Nuvion to launch stablecoin balances for merchants and users across its platform.

In April 2026, Flutterwave received a national microlender license from the Central Bank of Nigeria, allowing it to offer bank accounts, hold customer deposits, and extend credit directly to customers in Nigeria. The services had previously been provided through Flutterwave's partner banks.

== Awards and recognitions ==
Flutterwave has been recognized as one of the most innovative fintech companies globally, receiving numerous awards and accolades for its contributions to digital payment solutions, including ‘Fintech of the Year’ at the African Banker Awards in 2024. In March 2024, Flutterwave was named one of the most innovative companies in the Europe, Middle East, and Asia category in the 2024 Fast Company’s Most Innovative Companies list. In May 2024, Flutterwave was named to the 12th annual CNBC Disruptor 50 list, highlighting its rapid growth and successful funding rounds from prominent venture capital firms such as Tiger Global Management and Salesforce Ventures.

Flutterwave was named to the 2024 CNBC Disruptor 50 list. That same year, CNBC and Statista included Flutterwave in the top 250 fintech companies in the world for the first time in 2024.

== Digital store ==
At the peak of the COVID-19 pandemic, Flutterwave built a digital store to help medium and small-scale businesses that were badly impacted by the global lockdown to display their products for market online. Over 20,000 businesses enrolled on the store for free through a campaign called "keeping the lights on".

== Switching license ==
On September 1, 2022, Bloomberg reported that the Central Bank of Nigeria had granted Flutterwave the country's highest payment processing license, which allows it to process transactions between banks and cards without intermediaries. The switching processing license grants Flutterwave autonomy across the payments ecosystem value chain. This includes processing funds transfers between banks and fintechs, as well as participating in agency banking and other payment services.

== Controversy ==
=== Kenya licensing and Money Laundering Allegations ===
In July 2022, a Kenyan High Court froze accounts held by Flutterwave containing over 6.2 billion Kenyan shilling, following allegations by Kenya's Assets Recovery Agency (ARA) that the funds were linked to money laundering and credit card fraud. The Central Bank of Kenya (CBK) also disclosed that Flutterwave was not licensed to operate in the country. Flutterwave denied accusations of financial misconduct.

In February 2023, the ARA withdrew its case against Flutterwave, and a Kenyan court released $51.9 million that had been frozen. The court documents revealed that the agency absolved Flutterwave of any wrongdoing, effectively clearing the company of all allegations.

In response to the licensing issue, Flutterwave disclosed that it submitted applications for licensing to the CBK as early as 2019, but these were still pending approval. Recent developments indicate that the CBK is revising its regulatory framework, which could allow Flutterwave and other fintech companies to obtain the necessary licenses to operate in Kenya.

=== Harassment ===
Flutterwave has been subject to multiple lawsuits and allegations for denying former employees stock rights as well as having a culture of bullying and harassment. In response, the company stated it has taken action against individuals within the company responsible for harassment.

=== Fraud ===
On March 3, 2023, a Twitter user tweeted about a hack at Flutterwave. Two days later, on March 5, Flutterwave denied the report of a hack, stating that customers did not lose any funds. However, several sources told TechCabal that they lost funds and their accounts were frozen. The court documents seen by TechCabal included a petition by Flutterwave's legal counsel to the police, dated February 20, 2023. On February 8, 2024, TechCabal further published an exclusive report into how Flutterwave has been defrauded up to the tune of $24m through a court order secured to obtain return of such funds from over 6,000 Nigerian bank customers.

== See also ==
- Interswitch
- Paystack
- PayPal
- Stripe (company)
- E-commerce payment system
- List of online payment service providers
- Payment service provider
