= Adam Robinson (author) =

American writer and chess player (born 1955)

Adam Robinson (born 1955) is an American educator, freelance author, and a US Chess Federation life master. He is the co-founder of The Princeton Review. He currently works as a global macro advisor to the heads of some of the world's largest hedge funds through his company Robinson Global Strategies.

Robinson co-authored Cracking the SAT with John Katzman, the only test preparation book ever to become a New York Times best seller. His other books include Cracking the LSAT, What Smart Students Know, and The RocketReview Revolution.

== Personal life ==
Born in Manhattan in 1955, Robinson attended Evanston Township High School in Illinois and was second board on the National High School Chess Championship Team his senior year. He is a rated US chess master. He received his graduate degree in jurisprudence from Oxford University after receiving his undergraduate degree in finance and accounting from the Wharton School of the University of Pennsylvania. He currently lives in Manhattan.

== Works ==
- What Smart Students Know: Maximum Grades. Optimum Learning. Minimum Time. Three Rivers Press, (1993). ISBN 0-517-88085-7.
- Cracking the SAT with John Katzman. Villard Books, (1986). ISBN 0-394-74342-3.
- The Rocket Review Revolution: The Ultimate Guide to the New SAT. NAL Trade; (2006). ISBN 0-451-21946-5.
