= America's College Promise =

2015 Obama administration proposal for free community college tuition

America's College Promise was a proposal by the Barack Obama administration to offer all students two free years of community college tuition. It was based on the Tennessee Promise, a similar program for the state of Tennessee. State level programs, like the Tennessee Promise, have faced critique for their ability to fill tangible educational benefits. The bill was referred to committee in July 2015, where it languished. Later that year, Obama announced the College Promise Advisory Board, an independent coalition of American leaders in community college, political, foundation, and business sectors to advocate for the proposal. A criticism of the plan is its lack of focus on existing student loan debt. Senator Tammy Baldwin and Representative Andy Levin re-introduced the bill in July 2019.

Tennessee was the first to offer free community college. To be eligible for the Tennessee Promise, you must meet the requirements of a Tennessee Promise partnering organization, apply senior year and meet application deadlines, attend all team meetings and college orientation, begin in the Fall, maintain at least twelve hours per semester, attend for consecutive semesters, complete FAFSA, maintain a 2.0 GPA, and complete at least eight hours of community service per semester.
