= Unigo =

- Founded: 2008
- Headquarters: New York, Portland, Florida
- Founder: Jordan Goldman (CEO from 2008 - 2014)
- Industry: Internet
- Parent: Education Dynamics
- Website: Official website

Unigo is an crowdsourced review website for colleges and universities. The company was founded in 2008.

== History ==
The company was founded by Jordan Goldman, a Wesleyan University alumnus, in 2008. The website hosts crowdsourced reviews of colleges and universities from students and admissions counselors, as well as photos and videos. In 2012, the site launched AbsoluteAdmit, a college applications counselling service. As of 2012, the site had 2 million registered users and received 14 million unique visitors per year.

In 2015, it began providing student loan information to Bankrate.com.

In 2014, the firm was acquired by EDPlus Holdings, LLC. In July 2016, EDPlus Holdings soldUnigo.com, along with EStudentLoan.com, to Education Dynamics.
