= Technologist =

Technologist may refer to:

- Applied science technologist, a Canadian professional title in engineering and applied science technology
- Architectural technologist, a specialist in the technology fields of building, design and construction
- Cardiovascular technologist, a health specialist who uses imaging technology to help diagnose cardiac and vascular ailments
- Chemical technologist, a worker who provides technical support or services in chemical-related fields
- Civic technologist, a specialist capable of satisfying societal needs by exploiting technologies
- Educational technologist, a specialist in tools to enhance learning
- Electrical technologist, a person whose knowledge lies between that of an electrical engineer and an electrical tradesperson
- Engineering technologist, a specialist who implements technology within a field of engineering
- Industrial technologist, a specialist in the management, operation, and maintenance of complex operation systems
- Information technologist
- Medical technologist, a healthcare professional who performs diagnostic analysis on a variety of body fluids
- Polysomnographic technologist, a health specialist who administers overnight polysomnograms
- Professional technologist, a Canadian and Malaysian professional title in engineering and technology related fields
- Radiologic technologist, a medical professional who applies doses of radiation for imaging and treatment
- Surgical technologist, a health specialist who facilitates the conduct of invasive surgical procedures
- Technologist (magazine), a European science magazine
