= Kevin Carey =

American journalist

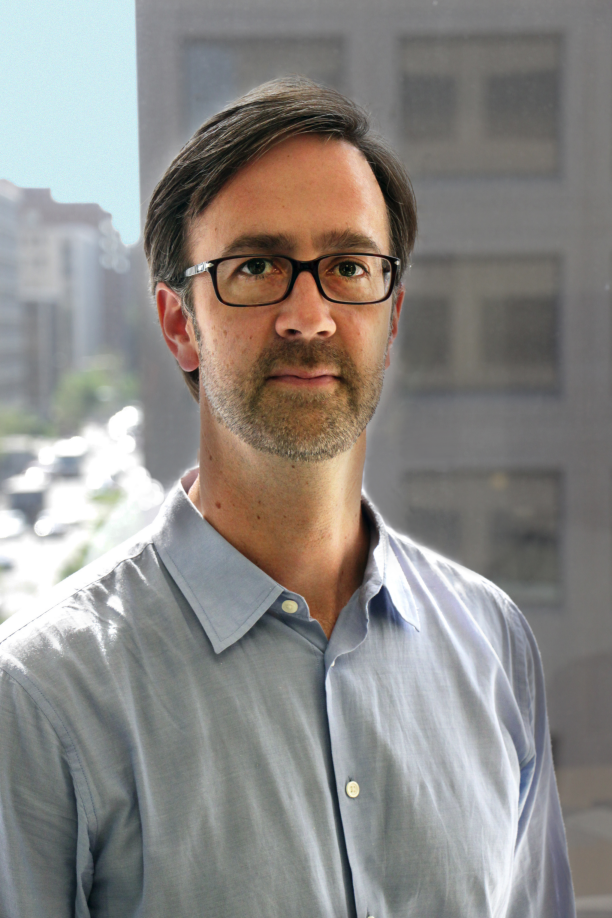
- Born: October 6, 1970 (age 55); Santa Barbara, California, U.S.
- Education: Binghamton University (BA); Ohio State University (MPA)
- Occupations: Higher Education writer, analyst
- Known for: Analysis of college costs, MOOCs, and student unit records

Kevin Carey (born October 6, 1970) is an American higher education writer and policy analyst. He serves as Director of the Education Policy Program at New America, a non-profit, non-partisan research organization based in Washington, D.C. He writes regularly on education for The Upshot at the New York Times, and is guest editor of the annual Washington Monthly College Guide. He has taught education policy at Johns Hopkins University, and was a monthly columnist for six years at The Chronicle of Higher Education. He has been described by New York Times Washington columnist David Leonhardt as “one of the sharpest higher education experts out there” and by Washington Post education reporter Jay Mathews as “the best higher education writer in the country.”

Carey has written features and articles for The New York Times, The New Republic, Slate, and The American Prospect, among other publications. He has testified to the United States Senate and House of Representatives committees on education, and has appeared as a commentator on CNN, C-SPAN, NPR, and other media outlets. His book, The End of College: Creating the Future of Learning and the University of Everywhere, was published by Riverhead Books in 2015. He has co-edited three books on education, including Stretching the Higher Education Dollar. His writing was anthologized in Best American Legal Writing, and he has received an Education Writers Association award for commentary.

Prior to joining the New America Foundation, Carey served for eight years as policy director at Education Sector, and before that in various analyst roles at the Education Trust, the Center on Budget and Policy Priorities, and the Indiana Senate Finance Committee. Between 1999 and 2001 he was Indiana’s Assistant State Budget Director for Education.

== Education and personal life ==
Carey has a bachelor's degree in political science from Binghamton University in 1992, and a Masters in Public Administration from Ohio State University in 1995. He lives with his wife and daughter in Arlington, VA.

== Career ==
Carey discusses the premise of his 2015 book, The End of College

After completing his M.P.A. at Ohio State University, Carey moved to Indianapolis, where he became an education finance analyst for the state of Indiana, helping to develop a new formula for setting property taxes and distributing state financial aid that was designed to help low-income children. He later became a Senior Analyst for the Indiana Senate Finance Committee, where he wrote legislation and advised the Democratic caucus on matters of fiscal policy. In 1999 he became Indiana's Assistant State Budget Director for Education, a position in which he advised Governor Frank O'Bannon on K-12 and higher education policy issues.

Carey moved to Washington, D.C. in 2001, and joined the Center on Budget and Policy Priorities (CBPP) as a policy analyst. His work at the CBPP focused on state poverty-based education funding programs. In 2003 Carey joined the Education Trust, where he served as Director of Policy Research and created the CollegeResults.org graduation rate website.

In September 2005, Carey helped found Education Sector, an independent education think tank. At Education Sector he led the organization's policy team, and headed up policy development in K-12 and higher education. His research focused largely on higher education reform issues, including the college rankings systems, and efforts to improve college graduation rates. He wrote extensively on college affordability and accountability issues, and drew particularly wide attention for a Winter 2010 essay in the journal, Democracy, on the role of the American higher education lobby in elevating student costs and obstructing efforts to improve accountability and transparency. He also wrote an in-depth profile of education historian Diane Ravitch for The New Republic in 2011.

In 2012 Carey became Director of New America's Education Policy Program, which focuses its research on improving outcomes for low-income learners and expanding public access to information. His recent research and writing has focused on the intersection of technology and higher education, including the prospects of digital badges in education, and Massive Open Online Courses.

== Books ==
- Carey, K., The End of College. Riverhead Books, 2015
- Kelly, A., and Carey, K. Stretching the Higher Education Dollar. Harvard Education Press, 2013.
- Carey, K., Kelly, A., and Wildavsky, B. Reinventing Higher Education: The Promise of Innovation. Harvard Education Press, 2011.
- Carey, K. and Schneider, M. Accountability in American Higher Education. Palgrave Macmillan, 2010.
