= Online program manager =

Provider of products and services for online courses at educational institutions

Online enrollments in higher education have grown substantially, especially after the global shutdown. Convenience and flexibility is not the only explanation for this rapid growth. Universities, facing budget shortfalls, have turned to Online Program Managers, commonly known as OPMs to recruit students and build online programs. OPMs provide bundled products and services to private and public educational institutions in exchange for a revenue sharing arrangement. Universities have come to rely on these services to recruit new students, design, develop, run online programs and more.

OPMs are often funded by private equity or venture capital as a for-profit enterprises. A revenue-sharing contract has allowed universities to enter into the online education business and gain market share without the need to build their own platform. Such predatory partnerships incentivise aggressive student recruitment (and revenue collection) while outsourcers core edtech capability in an institution.

== History ==
In the 2010s, OPMs grew substantially as universities recognized the financial benefits of reaching students beyond their geographical area while acknowledging their lack of skills in creating, maintaining, and optimizing online courses. Proponents of outsourcing from for-profit companies argue that it "helps universities save money and makes them more nimble and efficient." However, Moody's Dennis Gephardt warned that "more and more are cutting closer to the academic core."

For-profit colleges are the progenitors of online program managers. In 1973, San Jose University professor John Sperling, created the Institute of Professional Development (IPD), a company servicing a few colleges. IPD was the predecessor to the University of Phoenix. Fueled by Wall Street investors, for-profit colleges gained increased market share until 2010–2011, but declined in strength afterwards. OPMs increased in number and power during the decline of for-profit colleges, and they were expected to continue growing revenues for several more years. The COVID-19 pandemic accelerated the move of college courses to online format, a trend that is likely to continue. In 2018 and 2020, two former for-profit college companies, Kaplan Higher Education and Zovio, became online program managers. In 2021, two massive open online course (MOOC) developers, Coursera and edX, became part of the for-profit OPM business.

In 2018, Inside Higher Education published "A Tipping Point for OPM?" which stated that most experts thought a "shakeout" would be occurring among Online Program Managers. Kaplan Higher Education became the OPM for Purdue University Global. Kaplan had previously owned the school.

In 2019, 2U shares dropped more than 50 percent when it lowered its growth expectations.The Century Foundation found that many universities reached bad deals with OPMs and called for the institutions to take more control over their online efforts. The Century Foundation characterised OPMs as 'predatory for-profit actors masquerading' as public universities." MOOCs were also criticised for their low completion rates, typically about 3 percent.

In early 2020, the COVID-19 pandemic forced colleges and universities to quickly move to fully online content, increasing demand for OPM support. OPMs gained even greater scrutiny and criticism. Senators Elizabeth Warren and Sherrod Brown called for five OPMs to disclose the terms of their contracts with colleges and universities to determine whether they were violating laws to safeguard consumers from predatory enrollment practices. The companies mentioned were 2U, Academic Partnerships, Bisk Education, Pearson Learning and Wiley Education Services. In an analysis of 70 schools, the Century Foundation reported that "this growing private control—which is often hidden from public view—is jeopardising the quality of online programs, stripping control from colleges and universities, and putting students at risk of predatory behaviour and abuse at the hands of for-profit companies." Noodle acquired a competitor, HotChalk. Zovio also became the OPM for The University of Arizona Global Campus, after previously owning the school once known as Ashford University.

In 2021, two MOOCS became OPMs. Coursera became a publicly traded corporation valued at about $6 billion. 2U also announced that they would be acquiring edX, "to create an entity that would reach 50 million learners and serve most of the best universities in the United States and the world." The acquisition cost was $800 million. An article in Slate referred to expensive online master's degrees offered by OPMs as higher education's "second biggest scam." Udemy also became a publicly traded corporation. In November 2021, The Wall Street Journal had an expose on 2U and its aggressive marketing tactics.

In 2022, a survey of chief online learning officers found that OPMs weren't "meeting their expectations for marketing and recruitment, even though these are the services the college officials said they needed most."

In 2023, the US Department of Education announced that OPMs would be subject to greater oversight, including audits. Higher education institutions would be required to report details about their agreements with OPMs by May 1, 2023. 2U filed a lawsuit to push back against increased oversight. Pearson left the OPM business and Wiley was preparing to sell.

In November 2023, Academic Partnerships acquired Wiley University Services for $150 million.

In May 2024, Minnesota was the first state to bar its public colleges from making tuition-share contracts with online program managers.

In July 2024, 2U entered into Chapter 11 bankruptcy.

== Operations ==
According to the Hechinger Report, "OPMs market the programs, recruit students, counsel them through the admissions process, enroll them, provide the software and tech support needed for the programs to function and even help instructors design online-friendly courses." In return, OPMs are entitled to portions of the revenue. Marketing and advertising are the largest expenses for OPMs. 2U, for example, spends $300-$400 million in marketing and advertising in a single year, and 22 percent of all tuition costs go to "customer acquisition." Coursera spends more than one-third of its revenues on sales and marketing.

In 2019, higher education analyst Kevin Carey stated: "...OPMs are transforming both the economics and the practice of higher learning. They help a growing number of America’s most-lauded colleges provide online degrees—including Harvard, Yale, Georgetown, NYU, UC Berkeley, UNC Chapel Hill, Northwestern, Syracuse, Rice and USC, to name just a few. The schools often omit mention of these companies on their course pages, but OPMs typically take a 60 per cent cut of tuition, sometimes more."

In 2021, Coursera described an emerging strategy called the "consumer flywheel": creating stackable content and credentials from leading brand universities.

The revenue sharing model has been increasingly questioned inside and outside the industry as online learning has matured, and colleges gain more skills in this area, with some seeking a fee-for-service arrangement rather than a revenue sharing model.

Both Phil Hill and HolonIQ have also marked the increase in the fee for service market as universities select unbundled services to supplement their internal capabilities. These services are part of the evolution in the OPM space, known as Online Program Enablement (OPE or OPX).

== See also ==
- Educational technology
- For-profit higher education in the United States
- Massive open online course
