= Iyinoluwa Aboyeji =

Nigerian entrepreneur (born 1991)

Iyinola Aboyeji OON
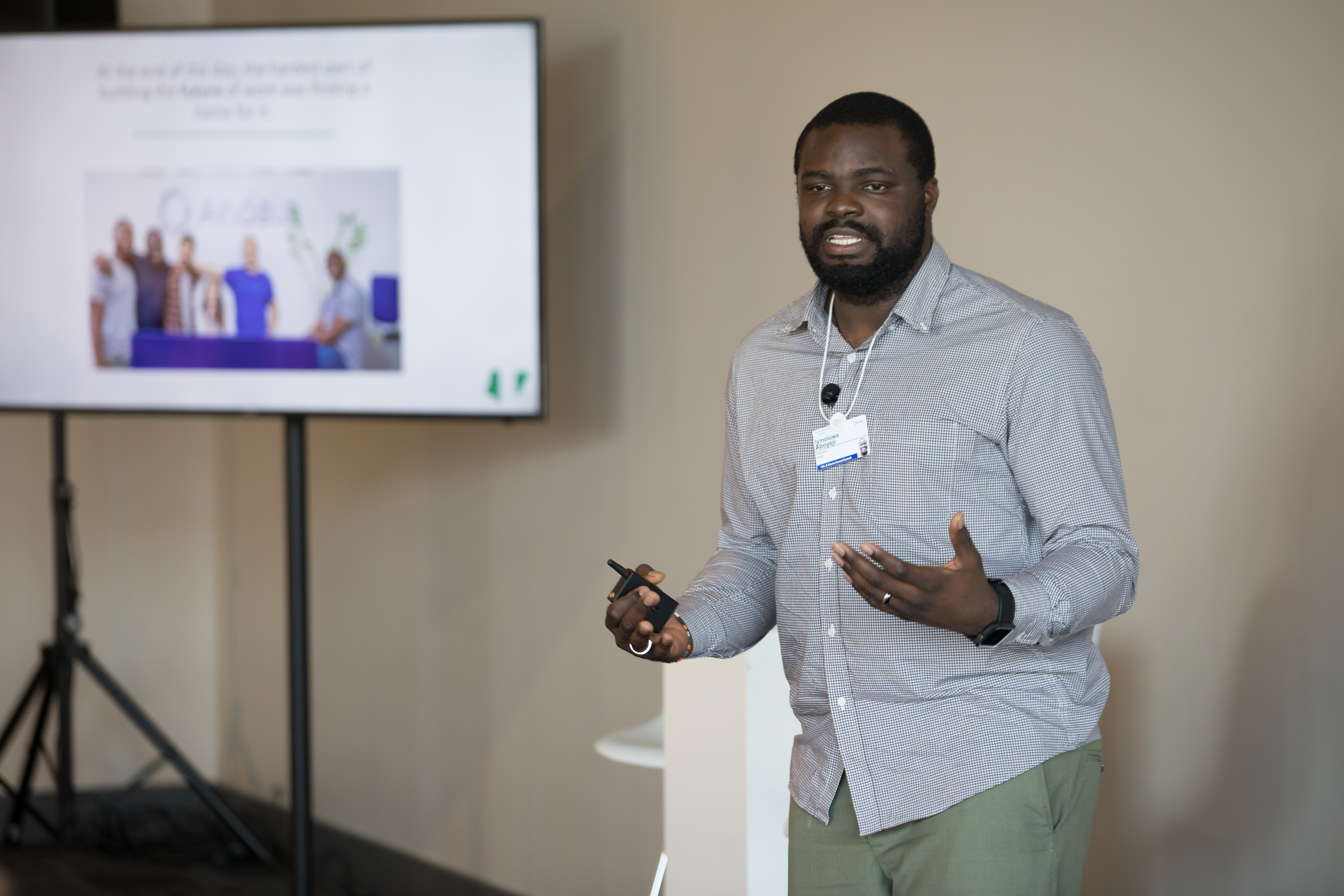
- Iyinoluwa Aboyeji at the YGL Alumni Annual Summit, 2018
- Born: Iyinoluwa Samuel Aboyeji; 28 March 1991 (age 35)
- Education: University of Waterloo; Loyola Jesuit College
- Occupation: Entrepreneur
- Known for: Co-founder of Andela; Co-founder and Managing Director of Flutterwave
- Website: iyinoluwa.org

Iyinoluwa Samuel Aboyeji OON (born 28 March 1991) is a Nigerian entrepreneur. He is the co-founder of Andela, and the former managing director of Flutterwave. Aboyeji was cited as one of the Top 100 most influential Africans by New African magazine in 2019. He is currently the CEO and General Partner of Future Africa, a venture platform valued at over six billion dollars. He is the founder and presently the Chairman of Learn2earn organisation

== Education ==
Raised by his reverend parents, Aboyeji attended St. Saviour Primary School and Loyola Jesuit College, where he completed his senior secondary in 2007. Afterward, he went to Columbia International College and earned a bachelor's degree in international and legal studies and international development from the University of Waterloo and St. Jerome's University.

== Career ==
Aboyeji co-founded Andela, a global job placement network for software developers in 2014. Andela is a billion-dollar business backed by top global investors, including Spark Capital, the Chan Zuckerberg Initiative, Google Ventures, and SoftBank. In 2016, he cofounded Flutterwave, Africa's leading payments technology company.

Aboyeji is currently the general partner and co-founder of Future Africa, a platform that provides capital, coaching and community for mission-driven innovators.

He has also worked as an advisor at Africa Angels Network (now CRE VC), which is currently the largest seed stage fund in Africa with over 18 investments across nine countries.

After co-founding Future Africa, Aboyeji served as the deputy director-general for Oby Ezekwesili's 2019 presidential campaign. He is also the co-founder and Chairman of the Talent City Inc, a construction company.

In November 2024, he was appointed with six others on the Nigeria's 3MTT Advisory Committee organised by the Federal Ministry of Communications, Innovation, and Digital Economy to improve employability in the digital space in Nigeria.

Iyinoluwa Aboyeji Unveils Learn2earn.ng to Transform Africa Talent Development

Learn2earn's Chairman Iyinoluwa Aboyeji, emphasized that DBI's robust infrastructure make it the ideal partner for the initiative, which is designed to develop a large pool of AI talent in alignment with Nigeria's 3MTT program.

== Companies founded ==
- Andela
- Flutterwave
- Future Africa
- Talent City Inc (now known as Itana)
- Bookneto Incorporation
- Fora
- StreetCapital 2018

== Philanthropy, awards and honours ==
On 11 October 2022, Aboyeji was conferred with National Honours Award of Officer of the Order of the Niger (OON) by President Muhammadu Buhari. In 2025, as a board member, he rallied support for the Kwara State Education Trust and described it as an initiative worth emulating by other states. His two co-founded companies, Andela and Flutterwave, are ranked among Africa's unicorns as of September 2025.
