= Lighthouse Labs =

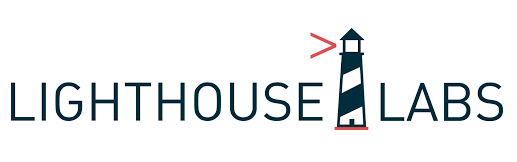
- Company type: Coding Bootcamp
- Available in: English
- Founded: 2013
- No. of locations: (Canada) Vancouver, Victoria, Calgary, Montreal, Toronto, Ottawa
- Industry: Education
- Parent: Uvaro
- Website: www.lighthouselabs.ca
- Current status: Defunct (Bankruptcy)

Lighthouse Labs was a tech education company that offered 12-week boot camps for web development and data science, as well as part-time up-skilling courses, with locations across Canada. In previous years, they organized an annual free learn-to-code event, The HTML500, in partnership with Telus. The company trained over 40,000 learners since its inception.

In January 2025, Uvaro, a Certified B Corp focused on workforce development, announced the acquisition of Lighthouse Labs; terms were not disclosed. Lighthouse Labs operated as a Uvaro subsidiary.

== Locations ==
=== Vancouver ===
Opened in 2013, Lighthouse Labs' first immersive boot camp facility started out of Launch Academy, an incubator in the city's Gastown neighborhood, before moving to new premises in downtown Vancouver in 2018. It offered a web development full-time program and a 12-week Data Science Bootcamp.

=== Toronto ===
As part of a national partnership with Highline, a seed-stage investment platform, Lighthouse Labs launched its Toronto operations in February 2015. Located in Devhub in downtown Toronto, it was one of several developer boot camps that offered in-person learning opportunities to individuals in the Greater Toronto Area.

=== Montreal ===
Operating out of the Spaces Mile End, Lighthouse Labs Montreal offered a 12-week Data Science Bootcamp, 12-week Web Development Bootcamp, and three part-time courses in web development and data analytics.

=== Victoria ===
Located in downtown Victoria at KWENCH, Lighthouse Labs partnered with other organizations in the area such as Viatech and Ladies Learning Code. The Victoria location ran the web development boot camp and data science boot camp twice a year and three 6-week part-time web and data analytics programs.

=== Calgary ===
In April 2015, Lighthouse Labs launched a 'pop-up' program in Calgary through its national partnership with Highline. Originally a 6-week part-time program, it grew into a satellite campus offering full- and part-time courses in front- and back-end development.

=== Ottawa ===
Lighthouse Labs hosted their part-time courses at Bayview Yards and hosted a Bootcamp to become a developer in 12 weeks at Spaces Laurier.

== Bankruptcy and closure ==
The partnership with Uvaro was short-lived. Seven months after the acquisition, on August 1, 2025, Lighthouse Labs and its parent company, Uvaro, filed for bankruptcy and immediately ceased operations.

The bankruptcy documents indicated that the company lacked the necessary liquidity to remain solvent. The collapse was attributed to a failure of key pipeline opportunities, including projected revenue from anticipated government contract awards and forecasted sales, which did not materialize within predicted timelines. This revenue shortfall led to a significant cash erosion, despite aggressive cost-cutting measures.

At the time of bankruptcy, Lighthouse Labs had approximately $230,000 in assets and liabilities exceeding $3 million. All employees of both companies were terminated.

== See also ==
- Coursera
- The Data Incubator
- Codecademy
- Khan Academy
- General Assembly
- Lynda.com
- App Academy
- Bloc (code school)
