= Charles V. Schaefer, Jr. School of Engineering and Science =

Engineering and science school of Stevens Institute of Technology

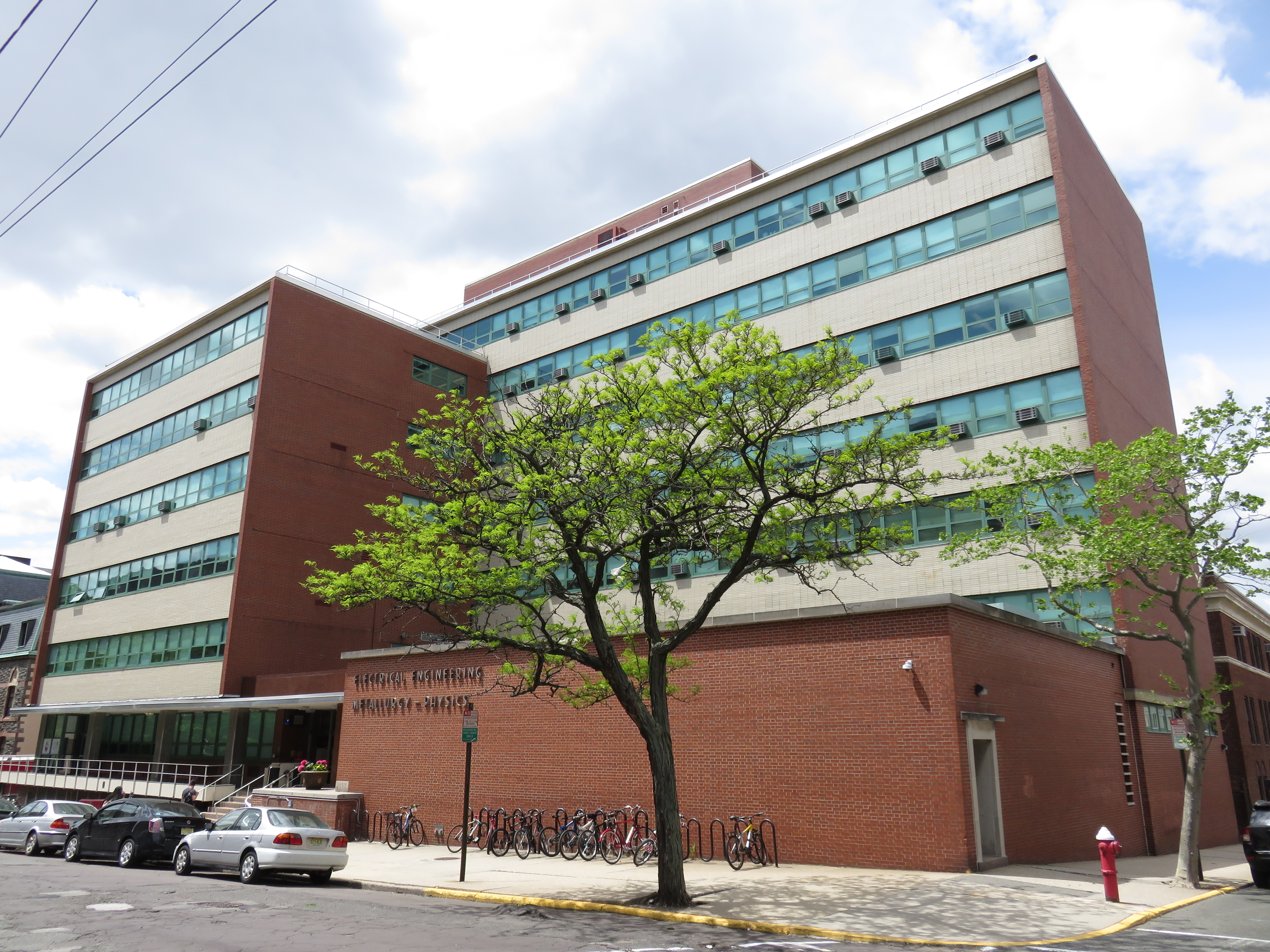
- The Burchard Building, which houses engineering laboratories on the Stevens campus
- Type: Private engineering and science school
- Established: 1870; 156 years ago (engineering instruction); 1996 (named for Charles V. Schaefer Jr.); 2009 (reorganized as School of Engineering and Science)
- Parent institution: Stevens Institute of Technology
- Dean: Jean Zu
- Location: Hoboken, New Jersey, U.S. 40.7423°N 74.0274°W
- Campus: Urban
- Nickname: SES
- Website: www.stevens.edu/school-engineering-science

The Charles V. Schaefer, Jr. School of Engineering and Science (SES), commonly the Schaefer School, is the engineering and science school of Stevens Institute of Technology, a private research university in Hoboken, New Jersey. It received its current name in 1996 in honor of alumnus and former trustee Charles V. Schaefer Jr., and took its present form, combining engineering with the natural and mathematical sciences, in 2009. Since 2017 the dean has been the mechanical engineer Jean Zu.

== History ==
=== Founding of Stevens and early engineering instruction (1870 to 1996) ===
Stevens Institute of Technology was founded in 1870 through an 1868 bequest of Edwin Augustus Stevens. Its founding curriculum was concentrated on mechanical engineering, and Robert H. Thurston, the institute's first professor of mechanical engineering, was elected the inaugural president of the American Society of Mechanical Engineers in 1880.

=== Schaefer School of Engineering (1996 to 2009) ===
In 1996 the engineering programs were organized into the Charles V. Schaefer, Jr. School of Engineering, named for Charles V. Schaefer Jr. (1914 to 1999), a 1936 alumnus who served as chair of the Stevens Board of Trustees and as co-chair of a four-year, $102 million capital campaign that preceded the naming. Schaefer's career in industry included a position as plant manager at the De Laval Steam Turbine Company in Trenton, New Jersey, ownership of several New Jersey manufacturing firms, and chairmanship of Schaefer Associates, an investment firm. He also funded the Charles V. Schaefer, Jr. Athletic and Recreation Center on the Stevens campus, dedicated in 1994.

Schaefer's son, Charles V. Schaefer III (1941 to 2025), was born in Trenton and later led several New Jersey engineering firms, according to a notice published through The New York Times obituaries network.

=== School of Engineering and Science (2009 to present) ===
In 2009 the school was reorganized to incorporate Stevens's natural science and mathematics departments alongside its engineering disciplines, taking its present form as the Charles V. Schaefer, Jr. School of Engineering and Science. Michael Bruno served as dean until early 2016; Keith Sheppard, the associate dean for engineering and science, then served as interim dean during a two-year international search.

Jean Zu was appointed dean in March 2017 and began her term on May 1 of that year. She joined Stevens from the University of Toronto, where she had been chair of the Department of Mechanical and Industrial Engineering since 2009 and was the first woman to lead that department. Zu is a scholar of mechanical vibrations, dynamic analysis, and mechatronics, and is a Fellow of the Canadian Academy of Engineering, the American Association for the Advancement of Science, and the American Society of Mechanical Engineers. She was reappointed to a second five-year term in 2022. During her first term, the school added 64 tenure-stream and non-tenure-stream faculty members.

== Campus and facilities ==
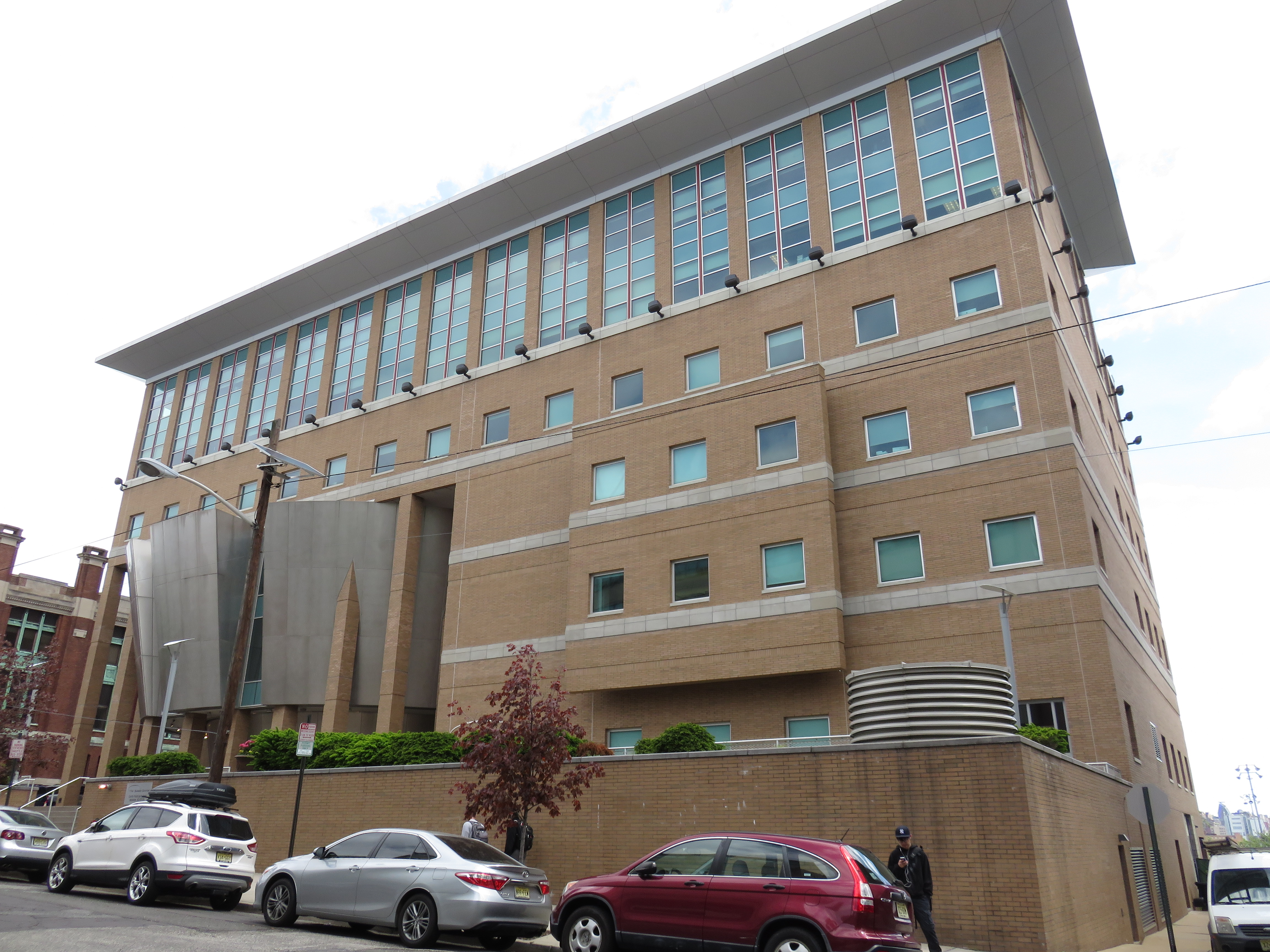
The Lawrence T. Babbio Jr. Center on the Stevens campus

The Schaefer School occupies the southern portion of the Stevens campus at Castle Point in Hoboken, overlooking the Hudson River across from Manhattan. Engineering and science research is conducted across several buildings on the campus, including Edwin A. Stevens Hall, the historic original building of Stevens Institute that was added to the National Register of Historic Places in 1994 and now houses the dean's office.

== Academics ==
=== Departments ===
The Schaefer School comprises nine academic departments:

- Biomedical Engineering
- Chemical Engineering and Materials Science
- Chemistry and Chemical Biology
- Civil, Environmental and Ocean Engineering
- Computer Science
- Electrical and Computer Engineering
- Mathematical Sciences
- Mechanical Engineering
- Physics

According to U.S. News & World Report, the school has approximately 115 full-time faculty and a doctoral student to faculty ratio of approximately 3.1:1 as of the 2025 reporting cycle.

=== Doctoral consortium ===
The school is a member of the Inter-University Engineering Doctoral Consortium (IUEDC), established in 2023 and led by the NYU Tandon School of Engineering. The consortium allows doctoral students at member institutions to cross-register for graduate engineering courses without paying additional tuition to the host institution. Other member institutions include Columbia University School of Engineering and Applied Science, Cornell Tech, Princeton University School of Engineering and Applied Science, Rutgers University School of Engineering, Stony Brook University College of Engineering and Applied Sciences, the City College of New York Grove School of Engineering, and the New York Institute of Technology College of Engineering and Computing Sciences.

=== Rankings ===
In its 2025 graduate engineering rankings, U.S. News & World Report ranked the school's graduate programs among American engineering schools, with individual program rankings including a tenth place ranking for Best Ph.D. in Data Science Programs.

== Notable people ==
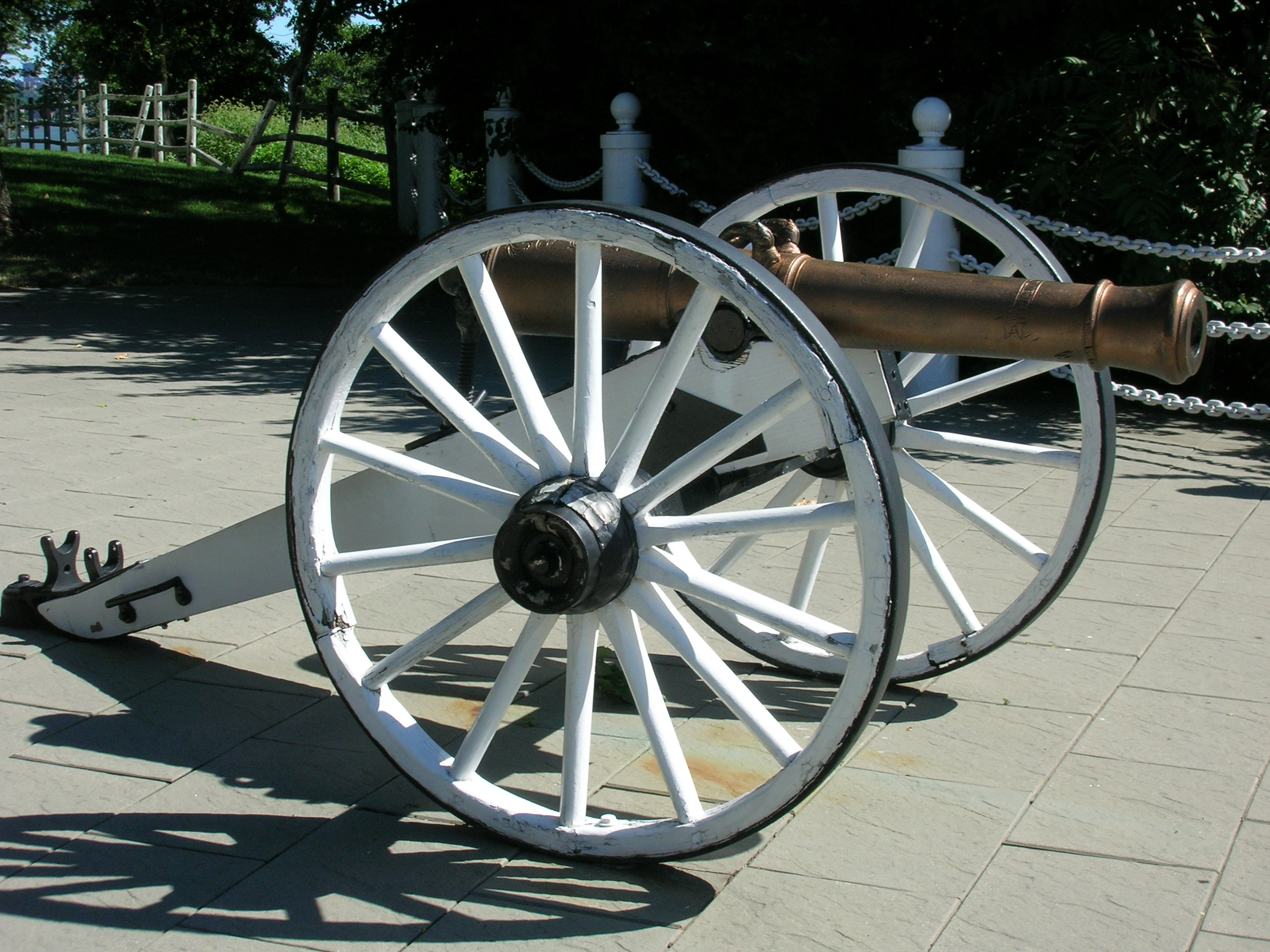
A Revolutionary War-era cannon on the Stevens campus

The following notable individuals studied or taught in engineering and science programs at Stevens that are now part of the Schaefer School:

- Frederick Reines (B.S. 1939, M.S. 1941), recipient of the 1995 Nobel Prize in Physics for the experimental detection of the neutrino
- Irving Langmuir (faculty), recipient of the 1932 Nobel Prize in Chemistry for his work in surface chemistry
- Bill Stromberg, former chairman and chief executive officer of T. Rowe Price
- Jean Zu, current dean of the Schaefer School and former chair of mechanical and industrial engineering at the University of Toronto
