= Learn to Code =

2010s public influence campaign

"Learn to Code" was a slogan and a series of public influence campaigns during the 2010s that encouraged the development of computer programming skills in an economy increasingly centered on information technology. The campaigns led to endorsements from politicians, the inclusion of programming in state school curricula, and the proliferation of coding bootcamps. Learning to code has a long history, with moments of enthusiasm and anxiety about computational literacy and the best methods to learn programming skills. A backlash erupted in 2019 in the form of online harassment of laid-off American journalists.

== Context ==
The notion of code literacy — that is, computer programming as an element of primary or liberal education — has been traced to Alan Perlis's 1962 essay "The Computer in the University." Perlis called for a course in the first two years of college in which students would write or observe a large number of programs. John Kemeny and Thomas Kurtz created the BASIC programming language in support of this goal, and the Logo language was introduced as a tool for early-childhood education. Follow-up research found little evidence of the predicted cognitive benefits of programming education, and the rise of the software industry and graphical user interfaces caused educational focus to shift in the 1990s toward end-user skills. Computers were also expensive, limiting the integration of coding skills into the school curriculum. By 1995, there were approximately three computers for every 30 children in American schools. Despite these factors, research and advocacy for programming literacy continued.

In the 2010s, valuations of information technology companies grew significantly. In March 2010, the top ten most valuable US companies included Microsoft and Apple at No. 2 and No. 3 and Google at No. 9. The following year Apple displaced ExxonMobil as the highest-valued US company. Technology venture capitalist Marc Andreessen remarked that "software is eating the world" and predicted that software would assume a central place in the US economy. Noting that unemployment remained high after the 2008 financial crisis, he proposed greater emphasis on education in all aspects of the software industry to avoid further unemployment caused by software-driven disruption. By June 2015 all three technology companies were at the top of the value ranking and Facebook at No. 12 had surpassed Walmart. By March 2019 Amazon had joined Apple, Microsoft and Google (Alphabet Inc.) in the top four, Facebook stood at No. 6, and payment technology company Visa Inc. was at No. 8.

Coding instruction was thoroughly transformed by commercialization and Internet-based teaching practices in the 21st century. Collectively, learning to code has taken on the trappings of a popular movement, with utopian ideals, charismatic leaders, capitalist narratives, and shared identities.

== Codecademy and Code.org ==
Zach Sims and Ryan Bubinski launched Codecademy in August 2011 with a mission to offer "crash courses" in computer programming to a broad audience. It received initial funding from several technology venture capital firms including Union Square Ventures, O'Reilly Media's AlphaTech Ventures, Y Combinator and Chris Dixon's Founder Collective. The following January Codecademy launched a viral marketing campaign called Code Year that urged people to make "learn to code" one of their New Year's resolutions. The launch of the campaign's web site, which featured endorsements from Codecademy's investors, was promoted on social media by New York mayor Michael Bloomberg and Washington Post reporter Ezra Klein, among others. Media outlets publicizing the launch included CNN, CNN Money, The New Yorker, Slate and Fast Company (with an article written by Sims).

Some commentators responded skeptically to Code Year. Personal computing journalist Matthew Murray countered that programming well enough to be professionally adept typically required years of practice and expressed reservations about the "commoditizing and corruption" of a difficult career. More prominently, Jeff Atwood, co-founder of the programming question-and-answer site Stack Overflow, argued that the supply of coding talent should be balanced with its practical demand, which was constrained by the applicability of programming to problems and the disadvantages of writing more code than necessary. Former software developer Ciara Byrne was similarly critical in late 2013. Code Year was nonetheless successful at introducing the advocacy of code literacy into public discourse in the ensuing years. In one instance, NBC's Today show reported approvingly in November 2013 on a New York technology entrepreneur who gave a homeless man, Leo Grand, a laptop computer and JavaScript coding lessons.

January 2013 saw the founding of a permanent code literacy advocacy group, Code.org. The organization debuted with an advertisement featuring Bill Gates, Mark Zuckerberg, Jack Dorsey and other technology businesspeople, as well as non-technology personalities like musician will.i.am and athlete Chris Bosh. Code.org launched the "Hour of Code" campaign in December, with endorsements from Barack Obama, actor/businessman Ashton Kutcher and singer Shakira, which featured workshops at the Apple and Microsoft campuses and asked school teachers to devote an hour of class time to programming education. The group did not disclose its initial funding, but in 2016 it raised a total of $23 million for teacher training and policy advocacy from Facebook, Mark Zuckerberg, his wife Priscilla Chan, Microsoft, Google and Infosys.

In 2014 other programming education startups joined Codecademy for another Year of Code campaign that targeted the United Kingdom. Saul Klein, an early investor in Codecademy and Seedcamp, another participating startup, was on the campaign's board of directors. The BBC, a partner in the campaign, promoted it without consistently disclosing its involvement. Stirling University social scientist Ben Williamson studied the development of "learning to code" advocacy networks in the UK, describing them as "not a coherent and stable network but a messy hybrid of intentions, ambitions, and interests." He identified Code Club as an early manifestation of the movement, founded in April 2012 and supported by Microsoft, Google and the Department for Education.

== Policy impact ==
A December 2014 announcement by the Obama administration showed the results of code literacy activism. It included commitments by 60 school districts, philanthropic donors, the National Science Foundation (NSF) and the College Board to improve computer science education in schools. The administration announced more direct federal support in March 2015 through the TechHire initiative. A joint effort among federal, state and local governments and the private sector, TechHire pledged $100 million in federal grants for non-degree programs to train people in software development. Codecademy and bootcamp programs at Flatiron School, Galvanize and Hack Reactor were noted as examples of the accelerated training approach that would be supported. In 2016 Obama requested $4.2 billion in funding for computer science education. This was not approved, but more limited funding was directed through the NSF, the Department of Education and Americorps toward teacher training and education research. At the state level, Arkansas governor Asa Hutchinson spent $5 million to promote coding education in public schools and established an online training system for rural schools.

Policy results were also achieved in other countries. The UK Department for Education updated the standard school curriculum in 2013 to add computing as a "fourth science," and the government committed £84 million to computer science education improvements in 2017. The Swedish government endorsed a national information technology education policy in 2016, with coding requirements, to be funded and implemented at the local level. When asked about coding education for children in a 2015 "question time" session, Australian prime minister Tony Abbott dismissed the idea, even though his government had already committed A$3.5 million to coding as an optional part of the school curriculum. The succeeding government of Malcolm Turnbull amended Abbott's national curriculum to include coding education from year 3 onward, and approved A$7 million for online training of teachers.

== Training outcomes ==
The retraining of coal miners in central Appalachia became a testing ground for "learn to code" efforts. When Bloomberg was asked in April 2014 about phasing out coal power due to clean energy commitments, he agreed that it was necessary but cautioned that technology jobs were oversold as a solution to unemployment. In 2016 several optimistic reports appeared about Bit Source, a web development startup in Pikeville, Kentucky staffed with retrained coal miners. Subsequent reports suggested a more mixed record, with miners completing the program of one Appalachian training academy but not receiving their certificates or finding any jobs. Despite such concerns, Democratic presidential candidate Joe Biden endorsed learning to code as a way forward for miners and other blue-collar workers during a campaign speech at Derry, New Hampshire on December 30, 2019: "Anybody who can go down 300 to 3,000 feet in a mine, sure in hell can learn to program as well, but we don't think of it that way. Even my liberal friends don't." Washington Post reporter Dave Weigel, who broke the remark on Twitter, commented that such exhortations to "just transition" had harmed Hillary Clinton's campaign in 2016, and Democratic congressional candidate Brianna Wu called it "tone-deaf and unhelpful."

A series of coding school closures in 2017 prompted a reconsideration of the model; a Bloomberg report found that several large San Francisco Bay area technology companies were unsatisfied with coding schools' results and did not pursue their students for employment. A broader survey in 2018 by Stack Overflow found that nearly half of bootcamp graduates were current software developers building their skills. Among the remaining 54.5%, 16.3% found a job immediately while 20% took three months or longer.

== Harassment of journalists ==
In January 2019 Huffington Post, Gannett, BuzzFeed and Verizon Media announced layoffs of journalists. As the journalists confirmed their involvement on social media, strangers responded with a torrent of mockery and hate speech mixed with suggestions to learn to code. The harassment was found to be coordinated on 4chan, a lightly moderated and anonymous message board that had previously coordinated the GamerGate campaign. Twitter responded by blocking accounts involved in the harassment, drawing derision from Fox News personality Tucker Carlson and suggestive endorsements of the harassment from right-wing figures Ben Shapiro, Donald Trump Jr. and David Duke.

== Aftermath ==
Technology companies continued to grow in value through 2020 and 2021. The COVID-19 pandemic created demand for online commerce and work arrangements while hampering other sectors, and investment capital flooded into the sector. A new campaign fronted by Ivanka Trump and Apple CEO Tim Cook advised workers laid off in the pandemic to "find something new" by pursuing education in various fields, including web development. At the end of March 2021, the five most valuable US companies were information technology companies, four had valuations exceeding $1 trillion, and Apple had a valuation exceeding $2 trillion. The reopening of workplaces and the tightening of credit policy by the Federal Reserve counteracted both trends that had driven this boom. During 2022 and 2023 technology companies announced layoffs that cast doubt on computer programming as a sure career bet, while industry insiders began to talk up the prospect of eliminating human programmers with low-code/no-code tools and generative artificial intelligence.

== See also ==
- Atari Democrat
- Competitive programming
- Computer Lib/Dream Machines
- Job obsolescence
- List of educational software for computer programming
- List of online integrated development environments
- List of software programming journals, List of computer magazines, List of computer books
- List of free and open-source software packages for programming
- New Math
- One Laptop per Child
- Technological unemployment
- AI-assisted software development
- Vibe coding
