= Michael Riedel =

Michael Riedel may refer to:

- Michael Riedel (artist) (born 1972), German contemporary artist
- Michael Riedel (journalist), theater columnist for the New York Post
