= Michael Li =

American data scientist

- Education: Rockefeller College, Princeton University (BS), (PhD); Churchill College, University of Cambridge (Masters); Cornell Tech, Cornell University (Postdoc); Oregon Episcopal School
- Occupations: Data Scientist, Entrepreneur
- Known for: The Data Incubator
- Awards: Intel Science Talent Search (2003); Marshall Scholarship (2006); Hertz Fellowship (2007); National Science Foundation Graduate Research Fellowship Program (2007)
- Website: https://tianhui.li/

Michael Li
- Traditional Chinese: 李天惠
- Simplified Chinese: 李天惠
Transcriptions
Standard Mandarin
- Hanyu Pinyin: Lǐ Tiānhuì

Michael Li (born 1985, Portland, Oregon; Chinese name: Tianhui Li) is an American data scientist, entrepreneur, and the founder and Chief Executive Officer of The Data Incubator, a data science training and placement company. Since 2023, he has also been serving as CTO at Aerial, a legal-tech start-up helping companies manage their corporate information and scale fast.

== Early life ==
Li attended Oregon Episcopal School in Portland, Oregon. In 2001, he was selected to perform with the Oregon Symphony. In 2003, he built a "desktop nuclear fusion reactor" based on work at NASA and won second place and $75,000 at the Intel Science Talent Search , becoming the youngest person to date to build a "fusor" desktop nuclear fusion reactor and receiving press coverage in The New York Times. As a result of the competition, he has an asteroid (15083 Tianhuili) named after him. He was also a semifinalist at the Siemens Westinghouse Competition, founder of Oregon Episcopal School's science bowl team, and a member of USA Today High School All-America First Team in 2003.

== Academic career ==
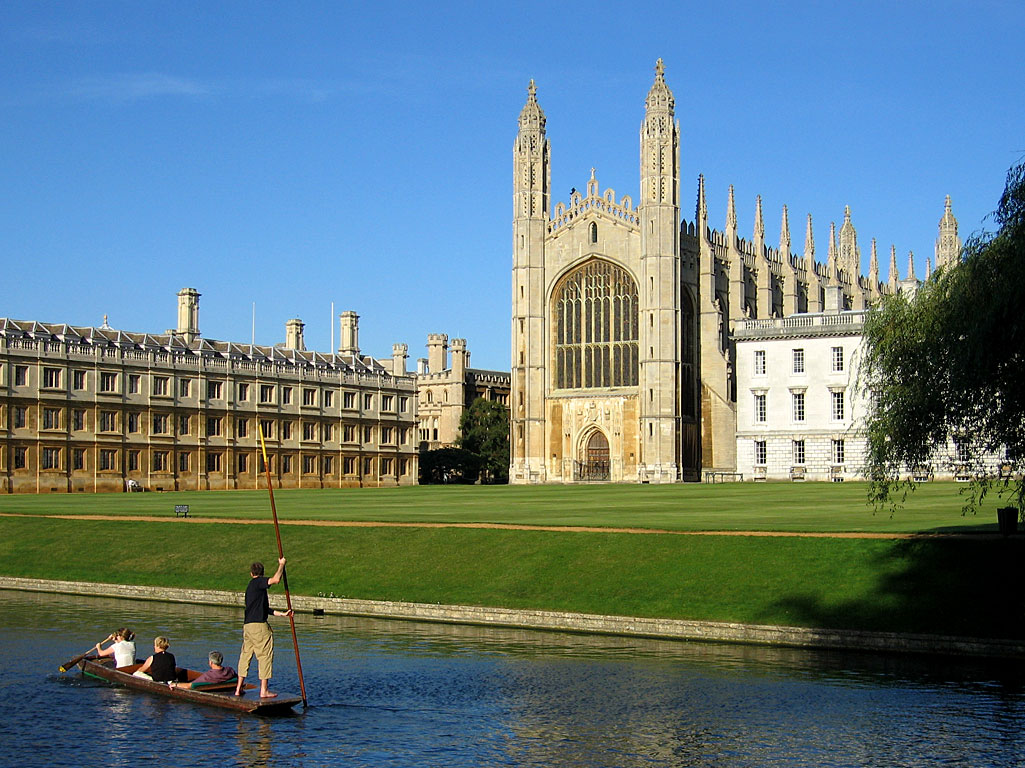
Michael Li studied at Cambridge University as a Marshall Scholar and currently serves on the Board of Directors of the Association of Marshall Scholars.

Li graduated from Princeton University in 2007 with degrees in mathematics and computer science. In 2006, he was selected as a Marshall Scholar and in 2007, he was selected as both a National Science Foundation Graduate Research Fellow and a Hertz Fellow. The Marshall Scholarship program was established in 1953 as a British gesture of gratitude toward the United States for the assistance received after World War II under the Marshall Plan; the Hertz Foundation awards $250,000 fellowships to Ph.D. students in the applied physical, biological and engineering sciences. Li read Part III of the Mathematical Tripos at Churchill College, Cambridge and completed his PhD at Princeton University. He was one of two former USA Today High School Academic All-America First Team members to be also selected for the USA Today College All-America First Team. He was a fellow of the Princeton-Harvard China and the World Program and co-chaired Princeton University's Undergraduate Research Symposium's steering committee.

Li's academy research focused on mathematical finance. He has written a number of papers in the field, including a number coauthored with Robert Almgren on market impact and market microstructure and Patrick Cheridito on risk measures on L^p spaces. He was selected for the prestigious Cornell Tech Runway Program postdoc.

== Professional life ==
After graduating, Li worked at D.E. Shaw, J.P. Morgan, and Bloomberg and became the first data scientist in residence at Andreessen Horowitz. He headed data science monetization at Foursquare. He is a regular contributor to publications like Harvard Business Review, MIT Sloan Management Review, Tech Crunch, Venture Beat, Fast Company, Entrepreneur Magazine, and The Wall Street Journal discussing topics around equality in hiring, data analytics, and mathematics education.

In 2013, he founded The Data Incubator, a data science education company. The firm is best known for a free fellowship that helps students with PhDs transition from careers in academia to data science. The program attracts thousands of applicants regularly and is more selective than Harvard University. Li founded the program based on his own experience as a PhD trying to enter industry and data scientist hiring manager. The Data Incubator has received press coverage in Financial Times, VentureBeat, Computerworld, and The Next Web. He has been invited to speak at various conferences in the United Kingdom, Malaysia, Beijing, Shanghai, and at MIT Sloan School of Management.

Li serves on the Board of Directors for the Association of Marshall Scholars and America Needs You, an American non-profit that pairs low-income first-generation college students with professional mentors. He is also an advisor for The Innovation Enterprise, Expii, the LendIt, a member of the O'Reilly Strata programming committee, and the National Leadership Council for Society for Science and the Public.
