= Dom Pérignon =

Brand of vintage Champagne

- Product type: Champagne
- Current owner: LVMH
- Country: France
- Introduced: 1921; 105 years ago (first vintage); 1936; 90 years ago (first sale)
- Website: domperignon.com

Dom Pérignon (/ˌdɒm pɛrɪnˈjɒn/ DOM perr-in-YON, French: [dɔ̃ peʁiɲɔ̃]) is a brand of vintage Champagne. It is named after Dom Pérignon, a Benedictine monk who was an important quality pioneer for Champagne wine but who, contrary to popular myths, did not discover the Champagne method for making sparkling wines.

== History ==
The first vintage of Dom Pérignon was 1921, and was only released for sale in 1936, sailing to New York on the SS Normandie. The brand, not exploited, was given by Champagne Mercier to Moët in 1927 for a wedding between the two families.

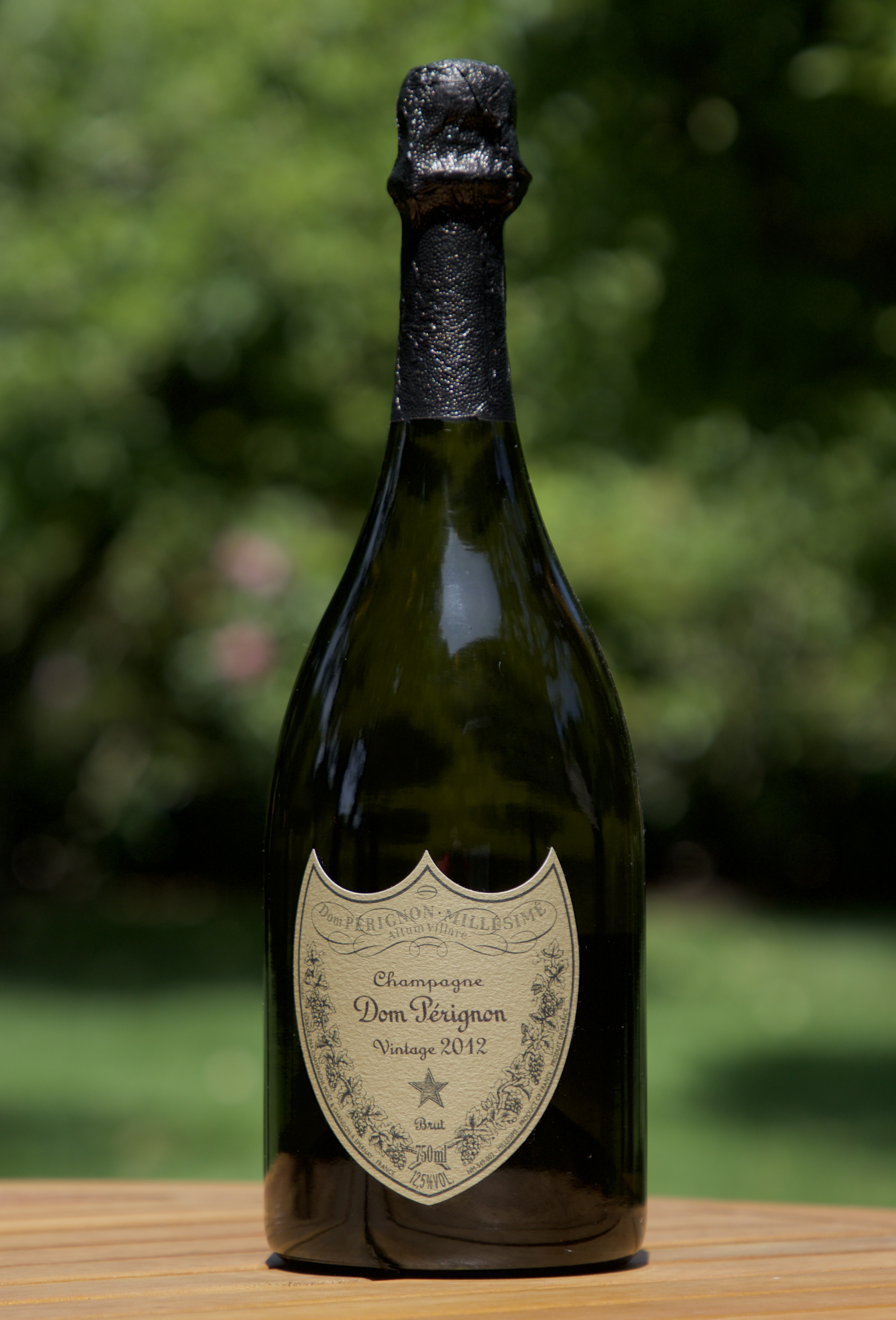
Bottle of Dom Pérignon

In 1935, 300 bottles of a 1926-vintage precursor to Dom Pérignon were sold to Simon Bros. & Co., the company that imported Moët in the United Kingdom, who gave two bottles to each of their 150 best customers to commemorate their centenary. While these bottles were almost identical to the subsequent Dom Pérignon releases, they did not display the Dom Pérignon name, rather "Champagne specially shipped for Simon Brothers & Co's Centenary 1835—1935." The wine got immediate attention in the marketplace and 100 boxes of the 1921 vintage were shipped to the United States shortly thereafter, this time displaying the Dom Pérignon name. James Buchanan Duke, the billionaire who founded the American Tobacco Company, ordered 100 bottles for himself. The 17 bottles sold at an auction in Christie's in New York City in June 2004 were part of that order (Doris Duke, the billionaire's daughter, had kept them in her cellar). According to Dom Pérignon cellar master Richard Geoffroy, who was Chef de Cave for Dom Pérignon from 1990 to 2018, the 1921 vintage had a "distinctive bouquet comprising sandalwood, vanilla and praline".

Until the 1943 vintage, Dom Pérignon was produced from regular vintage Moët & Chandon Champagne that was transferred to the special 18th century-style bottles after extended cellaring. It was, thus, effectively an "oenothèque" release of Moët & Chandon Vintage Champagne in a different bottle. From the 1947 vintage, Dom Pérignon has been produced separately from the start.

In 1971, the Shah of Iran ordered several bottles of the first vintage of Dom Pérignon Rosé (1959) for the 2,500-year celebration of the Persian Empire. A bottle of that champagne, from that order, was sold at auction for €24,758 in 2008.

In 1981, Dom Pérignon was chosen for the wedding of Lady Diana Spencer and Prince Charles. The magnums of Dom Pérignon Vintage 1961 served on that July 29 carried a special insignia created just for the ceremony.

== Vintages ==
Dom Pérignon is always a vintage champagne, meaning that all grapes used to make the wine were harvested in the same year. The wine is not made in weak years, i.e. when the general quality of the harvest is considered to be too low. The earliest market release of a vintage is usually after 8–10 years for the standard champagne, with longer maturation times for special editions like the Second Plenitude or Œnotheque (see below).

From 1921 to 2013, Dom Pérignon champagne has been produced in 45 vintages. More than two vintage years in a row is a rare phenomenon, which until 2006 had only occurred three times: 1969–1971, 1998–2000, and 2002–2006 (the first time five vintages were produced in a row). The 2008 vintage was the first released out of sequence, after the 2009 vintage.

The 48 white Dom Pérignon vintages released as of 2026 are 1921, 1926, 1928, 1929, 1934, 1943, 1947, 1949, 1952, 1953, 1955, 1959, 1961, 1962, 1964, 1966, 1969, 1970, 1971, 1973, 1975, 1976, 1978, 1980, 1982, 1983, 1985, 1988, 1990, 1992, 1993, 1995, 1996, 1998, 1999, 2000, 2002, 2003, 2004, 2005, 2006, 2008, 2009, 2010, 2012, 2013, 2015, and 2017.

Since 1959 a rosé version of Dom Pérignon is also produced. Twenty-eight Dom Pérignon Rosé vintages have been produced and released until 2026: 1959, 1962, 1964, 1966, 1969, 1971, 1973, 1975, 1978, 1980, 1982, 1985, 1986 (the first rosé vintage where the white version was not produced), 1988, 1990, 1992, 1993, 1995, 1996, 1998, 2000, 2002, 2003, 2004, 2005, 2006, 2008, and 2009.

== Second plenitude (P2) ==
P2, meaning 'second plenitude'. Dom Pérignon choose the best grapes from any of the 17 Grands Crus, including the legendary Premier Cru, Hautvillers and it is released in three different maturation time periods called Plénitudes. After close to 15 years of slow transformation in the cellars, the taste is, according to Dom Perignon, "wider, deeper, longer, more intense - and gifted further with an extended longevity."

The Chef de Cave monitors the maturation time to determine when the product can be disgorged.

The first Plénitude is the Dom Perignon released after 8–9 years of lees ageing. The second Plénitude is released after 15 to 20 years lees ageing. P3 is released after considerably more lees ageing and in very small quantities.

== Limited editions ==
Dom Pérignon has over the years collaborated with different artists, profiles and designers to create limited editions of the bottles design. Some of the limited editions are:

Vintage year	Limited edition
2000	Andy Warhol
2002	Andy Warhol
2003	David Lynch
2004	Metamorphosis by Iris van Herpen (Creator Edition)
2004	Jeff Koons
2006	Michael Riedel
2006	Rose limited edition by Lady Gaga
2006	Björk and Chris Cunningham
2008	Chef de Cave (Legacy Edition)
2008	Rose limited edition by Lady Gaga
2008	Lenny Kravitz
2009	Tokujin Yoshioka
2010	Lady Gaga
2015	Jean-Michel Basquiat

== Style ==
Dom Pérignon is always an assemblage of Pinot noir and Chardonnay grapes, although the final composition changes every vintage: at times a blend in perfectly equal proportions (e.g. 1990 Rosé), at times up to 60% Chardonnay (1982) or 60% Pinot noir (1969), and only once going over 60% (with 65% Chardonnay in 1970). According to Richard Geoffroy's Manifesto and blog: "Dom Pérignon expresses its first plénitude after seven years in the cellar", with a second plénitude 12 to 15 years after the vintage (first Œnothèque release, now referred to as P2) and a third plénitude after 30 to 40 years (second Œnothèque release, now referred to as P3). Around 2016, the producer stopped using the Œnothèque designation and started labeling new plénitude releases as P2 or P3, providing more clarity to the disgorgement date than the Œnothèque designation. The grapes entering the blend come from the best, most sunlit sites. Serena Sutcliffe comments: "With age, Dom Pérignon takes on a totally seductive fresh-toast-and-coffee bouquet, one of the most intriguing scents in Champagne."

== Current production ==
The number of bottles produced in each vintage is not precisely defined, although it is at least 5 million bottles.

As of July 2026, the current release of Dom Pérignon is from the 2017 vintage and the current release of Dom Pérignon Rosé is from the 2009 vintage.

== Auction market ==
Dom Pérignon is often traded at wine auctions, where it is frequently termed "DP". A wave of auction price records started in 2004, with the sale of the Doris Duke collection at Christie's in New York City. Three bottles of Dom Pérignon 1921 sold for US$24,675. In 2008, two sales held by Acker, Merral & Condit also left their mark on the history of Dom Pérignon, with three magnums of Dom Pérignon Œnothèque (1966, 1973 and 1976) selling for US$93,260 in Hong Kong, and a lot of two bottles of the legendary Dom Pérignon Rosé Vintage 1959 selling for US$84,700 in New York. Only 306 bottles of the 1959 Rosé Vintage were produced, and they were never sold. In 1971, it was served in Persepolis at the lavish festivities celebrating the 2,500th anniversary of the founding of the Persian Empire by Cyrus the Great.

On April 17, 2010, a new record was set for a sale of wine in Britain according to The Daily Telegraph. A buyer would have spent more than £35,000 for Methuselah (6 litre) 1996 Dom Perignon Champagne Rose (Rose Gold). This transaction took place at the Westbury Hotel at a party that followed the screening of the new film Boogie Woogie.

A vertical of Dom Pérignon Rosé Œnothèque, a world premiere release from the reserve cellar of Dom Pérignon, never commercially released before, was sold at a record price at a wine auction organized by Sotheby's in Hong Kong in May 2010. The 30 bottle lot of Dom Pérignon Œnothèque Rosé bottles and magnums from 1966, 1978, 1982, 1985, 1988, and 1990 achieved HK$1,331,000 (US$170,641), setting the world auction record for a single lot of champagne and is the first HK$1 million lot of wine Sotheby's has sold in Hong Kong.

== Bibliography ==
- Stevenson, Tom. World Encyclopedia of Champagne and Sparkling Wine (Fully rev. and updated ed.). South San Francisco, California: The Wine Appreciation Guild, 2003. ISBN 1-891267-61-2.
