= Thinkful =

Former online coding bootcamp

Thinkful (now Chegg Skills)
- Available in: English
- Founded: February 9, 2012; 14 years ago
- Headquarters: San Francisco, California, {{{location_country}}}
- Area served: Worldwide
- Owner: Chegg
- Founders: Roshan Choxi, Dave Paola
- Industry: Internet, Educational technology
- Services: Online coding bootcamps, skills training programs
- Parent: Chegg (since 2019)
- Website: www.chegg.com/skills/
- Commercial: Yes
- Current status: Active (as Chegg Skills)

Thinkful was an online interactive platform that offered coding bootcamps and skills training programs in areas including web development, data science, cybersecurity, and UX/UI design. In October 2023, Thinkful was rebranded as Chegg Skills following its acquisition by Chegg in 2019.

== History ==
Thinkful was founded in February 2012 by Roshan Choxi and Dave Paola, who met at the University of Illinois at Urbana–Champaign in 2008 before moving to San Francisco where the company was headquartered. The founders began tutoring students over Skype in 2012 and later introduced their platform at the Launch Festival in San Francisco.

The company raised $250,000 in seed funding in May 2012, $2 million in December 2013, and $6 million in Series A funding in November 2014.

=== Acquisition by Chegg ===
Thinkful was acquired by Chegg in 2019, becoming a member of the Chegg family while maintaining its brand identity. Under Chegg's ownership, Thinkful expanded its offerings and helped thousands of learners acquire skills to accelerate their careers or transition into new roles as software engineers, data analysts, cybersecurity professionals, and other technology positions.

=== Rebranding to Chegg Skills ===
In October 2023, Thinkful was rebranded as Chegg Skills as part of Chegg's unified approach to skills-based education. The rebrand reflected Chegg's mission to provide return on investment in education from traditional classroom learning to on-the-job skill development.

== Programs and services ==
Thinkful offered various bootcamp programs including:

- Web development
- Data science
- Cybersecurity
- UX/UI design
- Mobile application development

The platform served both individual learners and businesses, offering corporate training solutions to help companies address talent shortages and skills gaps.

=== Recognition ===
Thinkful was recognized as the highest-ranking bootcamp in Forbes Advisor's 2023 list of the Best Coding, Data Science, and UX/UI Design Bootcamps in the United States. The company worked with more than fifteen Fortune 1000 companies to provide employee training and development.

== Acquisition of Bloc ==
In April 2018, Thinkful acquired competitor online bootcamp Bloc for an undisclosed sum. Officials at Thinkful reported that Bloc was "almost breaking even" at the time of acquisition.

== Student demographics and outcomes ==
According to Thinkful's data, 66% of students lacked college degrees, reflecting the company's mission to provide alternative pathways to traditional higher education. The company reported that earnings growth for Thinkful learners outpaced the average for U.S. workers, with Hispanic or Latino and Black and African American respondents reporting the highest earnings gains.

== See also ==
- Coursera
- The Data Incubator
- Codecademy
- Khan Academy
- App Academy
- Chegg
- Educational technology
- Coding bootcamp
