= Comicsgate =

Movement against progressivism in the comics industry

Comicsgate is an alt-right harassment campaign meant to oppose diversity and progressivism in the North American superhero comic book industry. Its proponents targeted the creators hired, the characters depicted, and the stories told, and claimed that these elements have led to a decline in both quality and sales. The name is derived from Gamergate, a similar movement related to video games. Its members present it as a consumer protest, primarily advocating their views on social media; some have produced books intended to reflect the group's values. It is part of the alt-right movement, and has been described by commentators as a harassment campaign, which "targets women, people of color, and LGBT folk in the comic book industry". Threats of violence, as well as the vandalism of one store, have been attributed to the campaign.

== Views ==
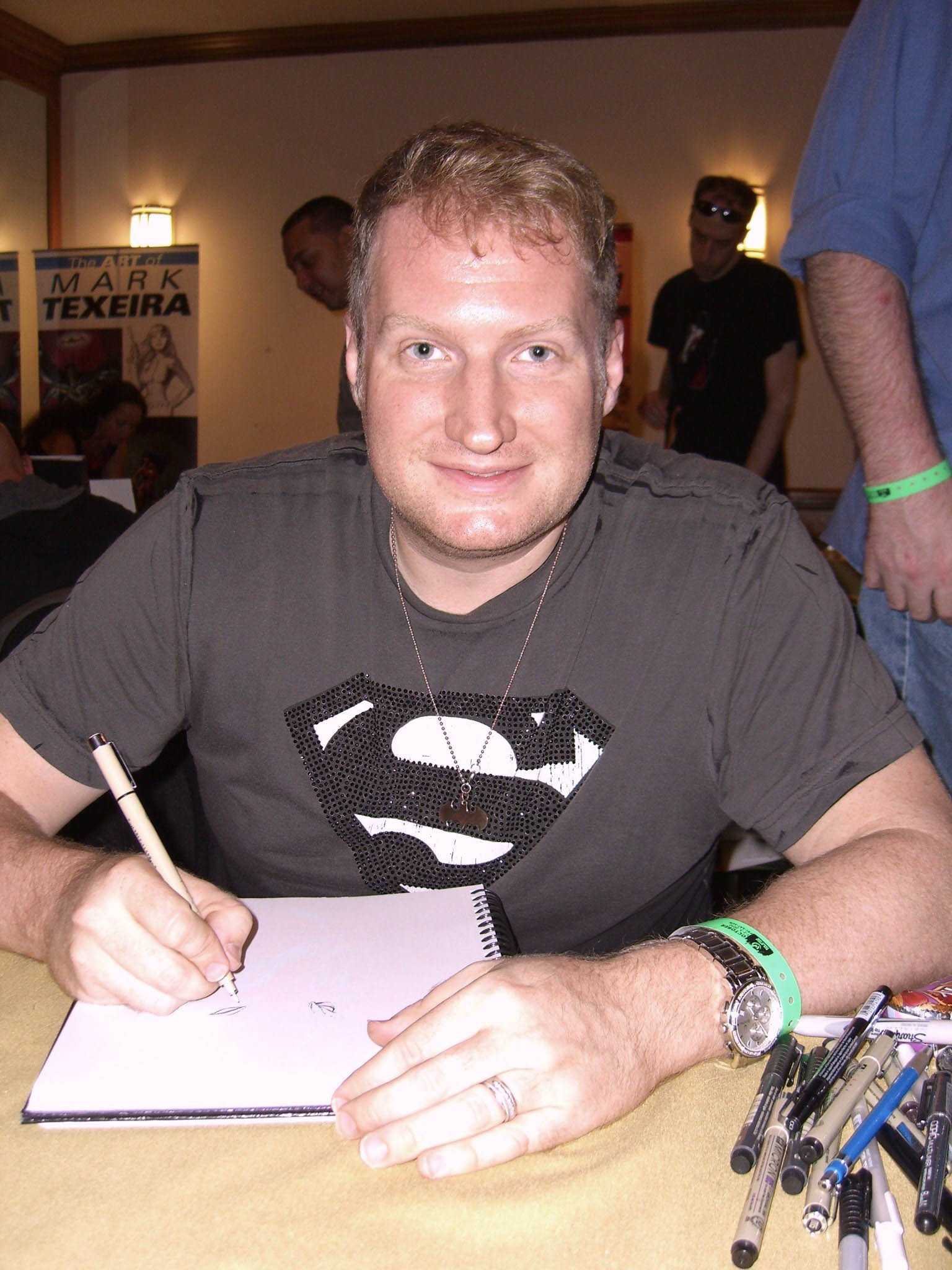
Comics artist Ethan Van Sciver has been a central figure in Comicsgate.

Key figures in Comicsgate include commentator Richard C. Meyer, who posted under the banner Diversity & Comics, and former DC Comics illustrator Ethan Van Sciver.

Members of the movement object to diversification of comics, especially the increasing inclusion of women as writers and characters. The storylines objected to include those such as the "All New, All Different" campaign undertaken by Marvel Comics in the later 2010s, in which various white male characters that had traditionally had the superhero identities of Wolverine, Thor, Hulk, Captain America, and Spider-Man were temporarily replaced by female or racial-minority characters. Comicsgate adherents have also complained about stories dealing with current social issues, and the depiction of women with less sexualized figures.

They argue that the increasing diversity of comics, both among creators and in terms of characters, has led to declining quality and sales. While it is true that comic sales declined in the late 2010s, this decline was across the board and not limited to, or worse for, the diverse comics that Comicsgate targets. Tricia Ennis, writing for SyFy Wire, stated that some such comics, in fact, had been notably successful, such as the Kamala Khan version of Ms. Marvel, Unbeatable Squirrel Girl, and the Carol Danvers version of Captain Marvel.

== Activities ==
=== Social media ===
In 2016, female superhero Mockingbird was depicted on a comic book cover wearing a t-shirt that read "Ask Me About My Feminist Agenda". This was followed by harassment on Twitter of series writer Chelsea Cain, including a posted illustration of Mockingbird depicted apparently dead after a brutal attack with her costume torn off, with the t-shirt phrase as a caption.

A July 2017 social media post by Marvel Comics assistant editor Heather Antos, featuring several young female coworkers getting milkshakes in memory of company veteran Flo Steinberg, drew attention from members of the movement. Antos was described by them as a "diversity hire", "an unqualified bimbo", and "the 'false rape charge' type", and the group in general as "fake geek girls", "tumblr-virtue signalers", and "the creepiest collection of stereotypical SJWs anyone could possibly imagine". Antos reported receiving rape threats and being doxxed, and—with her friends and coworkers—being the target of a prolonged campaign of online harassment.

Richard C. Meyer has made the campaign a common subject on his YouTube channel and Twitter account. He took credit for the firing of writer Aubrey Sitterson from the IDW comic G.I. Joe: Scarlett's Strike Force after Sitterson criticized on social media what he saw as "performative grief" about the September 11 attacks. In a 2017 video titled "The Dark Roast", Meyer referred to a female Marvel Comics editor as a "cum dumpster", accused various female professionals of "sucking their way into the industry", and described a transgender female writer as a "man in a wig".

Members of Comicsgate have responded to professionals criticizing the movement by circulating blacklists of such creators to boycott, including one which categorized individuals as members of the "Pravda Press", "SJW vipers", and other derogatory labels. Among those placed on such lists and criticized for their views have been Larry Hama, Mark Waid, Alex de Campi, Kelly Sue DeConnick, Matt Fraction, Eric July, Jen and Sylvia Soska and Ta-Nehisi Coates. Colorist Moose Baumann recounted that he received threats of violence after stepping away from Van Sciver's creator-owned book Cyberfrog. Media critic Kaylyn Saucedo, artist Tim Doyle, comic writer Kwanza Osajyefo, and cosplayer/comic writer Renfamous have all recounted being the target of harassment and doxxing.

=== Publishing ===
A few creators involved with Comicsgate have profited from the controversy it has produced, as with Meyer's No Enemy But Peace. Alt-right activist Vox Day wrote and published the series Alt-Hero and hired Chuck Dixon to write for him. Although Van Sciver has had Vox Day as a guest on his YouTube channel, both he and Meyer have since disavowed any association with him.

==== Jawbreakers ====
In early 2018, Meyer announced that his crowdfunded comic book Jawbreakers: Lost Souls, a collaboration with freelance artist Jon Malin, would be published by Antarctic Press. Upon learning that some store owners had discussed their decisions not to stock it, he encouraged his followers to publicly post and circulate their names, locations, and employee information. He accused Edmonton, Alberta store Variant Edition of "bullying and intimidating their own customers" after the female co-owner tweeted that they would not stock the publication. The store was subsequently vandalized and robbed. Dublin, Ireland, store Big Bang Comics, which was not stocking the book, received threats of violence on social media.

On May 13, Antarctic Press announced that they were ending their relationship with Meyer, citing his behavior. Meyer accused Mark Waid of pressuring Antarctic not to publish the book. Both Antarctic and Waid issued statements denying that any threats or bullying had taken place. In October 2018, Meyer sued Waid for "tortious interference with contract and defamation". In a motion to dismiss, Waid's attorney Mark Zaid asserted that Meyer's own public attacks against industry professionals were responsible, pointing to comments on Twitter calling writer Ta-Nehisi Coates "a race hustler", accusing a number of female professionals of being hired solely based on gender, and referring to trans and non-binary DC writers as "a modern day carnival". In December 2020, Meyer and Waid released a joint statement that Meyer had decided to voluntarily dismiss the case.

== Reception ==
Although many comics professionals have chosen to ignore Comicsgate to avoid giving it publicity, it has been met with widespread criticism from readers, comics creators, and industry journalists. In mid 2018, Marsha Cooke, widow of writer-artist Darwyn Cooke, denied a claim by Comicsgate participants that her husband would have supported the campaign. After she became the subject of online attacks on Twitter for this, industry veterans including Bill Sienkiewicz, Van Jenson, Tony Bedard, Jeff Lemire, and Magdalene Visaggio wrote rebukes to the movement. In a social media post, writer Scott Snyder, who teaches writing in college and DC Comics' talent development program, said the movement launched "cruel, personal attacks" on his students that "were (and still are) especially repugnant for their sexism, racism, homophobia, and transphobia". After Comicsgate participants claimed that writer Donny Cates supported them, he publicly denounced the movement, saying, "[N]o one is going to use my art to promote something that has attacked my friends."

Writer Tom Taylor posted a brief message on social media rejecting the tenets of Comicsgate, stating "I believe comics are for everyone. There is no excuse for harassment. There is no place for homophobia, transphobia, racism or misogyny in comics criticism." The social media post was retweeted by creators including Kelly Thompson, Tim Seeley, Margaret Stohl, Jason Latour, Greg Pak, Fabian Nicieza, Benjamin Percy, and Jeff Lemire. In an unsigned editorial, Paste magazine took issue with the phrasing of Taylor's statement, arguing that Comicsgate's activities should not be equated with critical commentary.

Greg Hatcher, former administrator of the Comic Book Resources forums, compared the movement to the harassment that drove actresses Kelly Marie Tran and Millie Bobby Brown from social media, and noted that comic creators in earlier decades such as Jack Kirby and Stan Lee had also faced fan backlash for including political themes in comic books. Van Sciver has faced backlash from other comic professionals for joking about suicide by Democrats, comments on Reddit about a "queer globalist mess", and hosting alt-right leader Vox Day in an episode on his YouTube channel. Van Sciver was also criticized for announcing a collaboration with cartoonist Dave Sim, who was known to have had a relationship with a 14-year-old girl. Van Sciver defended Sim, likening the relationship to that of Elvis and Priscilla Presley until later canceling the collaboration.

== See also ==
- Gamergate
- "Learn to Code"
- Portrayal of women in American comics
