= The HTML500 =

- Status: Active
- Locations: Vancouver, London, Ontario, Toronto, Calgary
- Country: Canada
- Years active: 3
- Founder: Khurram Virani, Jeremy Shaki
- Attendance: 500 per event
- Area: web development, technology
- Major events: Website programming
- Sponsor: Telus, Microsoft, IBM
- Website: www.thehtml500.com

The HTML500 is a multi-city Canadian technology conference that teaches 500 attendees per event the basics of HTML and CSS programming. Its goal is to promote web development and web programming literacy among Canadian youth, and open the doors for those who may be interested in pursuing careers in technology.

The HTML500 is Canada's largest educational technology event, having taught thousands of Canadians how to code since its inception. Its annual events are held in four Canadian cities: Vancouver, Toronto, London, and Calgary. Event sponsors include IBM, Telus (a Canadian telecom giant), the British Columbia Government's Innovation Council, and Microsoft.

HTML500 Calgary

HTML500 Vancouver

== History ==
The HTML500 was founded in 2013 by Canadian entrepreneurs Khurram Virani and Jeremy Shaki. Virani and Shaki are the co-founders of Lighthouse Labs, the largest Canadian coding bootcamp. Lighthouse Labs acts as the official sponsor and parent company of the conferences. In an interview with BetaKit, Shaki said of the educational initiative, "It's about more people in Canada understanding the value of digital literacy. It's about trying to get our governments and other major Canadian institutions involved in the conversation."

In 2014, the event expanded to three additional Canadian cities: Calgary, Toronto, and London.

The second annual event in Vancouver had over 2500 applicants, of which the official 500 were selected through a lottery process. Over half of the attendees were women. Beginning with the second Vancouver event, the Vancouver Economic Commission began running a career fair in tandem with the day's activities to further provide career resources to aspiring web developers.

The multi-city events are routinely covered on the Canadian Broadcasting Corporation television network.

== Event activities ==
Each event is designed to host 500 attendees. In each city, 50 local technology companies are chosen to help participate by managing and providing teaching assistance at one of the event's 50 attendee roundtables. All the partners and local community members who participate in the event donate their time voluntarily, as the event is a not-for-profit, and there is no entry charge.

Each event begins with a keynote speech plus an educational crash course taught by a notable member of the Canadian technology industry. Attendees are then provided with reference materials to assist them in the second phase of the schedule: building a website from scratch. By the end of the seven-hour schedule, it is the conference's goal to have removed the attendees' intimidation associated with programming, and to give them the confidence and resources needed to continue their web development learning if they choose to do so.
