= Turing College (edtech company) =

Lithuanian edtech startup

- Type: Private
- Industry: Online learning
- Founded: 2020; 6 years ago
- Headquarters: Vilnius, Lithuania
- Area served: Worldwide
- Key people: Lukas Kaminskis; Tomas Moška; Benas Šidlauskas
- Website: www.turingcollege.com

Turing College is a private educational technology company based in Vilnius, Lithuania. Founded in 2020, it provides online training programs in data science, analytics, artificial intelligence (AI), and digital marketing. The company delivers its programs primarily to adult learners and career changers through a self-paced, project-based learning model.

== History ==
Turing College was established in 2020 by Lukas Kaminskis, Tomas Moška, and Benas Šidlauskas. In 2021, it became the first Lithuanian startup to join the Y Combinator accelerator program (W21 batch). That same year, it raised a seed funding round led by Iron Wolf Capital.

In 2023, the company joined DiversiFAIR, an EU-funded initiative focused on intersectional fairness in artificial intelligence. It later introduced an AI ethics training program aligned with the project's objectives.

In 2024, Turing College received a €2.5 million grant from the European Innovation Council (EIC) to further develop its learning platform and AI-based education tools.

In 2025, the company acquired Boom Training, a UK-based apprenticeship provider, expanding into vocational training and government-funded learning in the United Kingdom.

Turing College provided online training as part of the EU-supported Digital Explorers program aimed at emerging markets, including Nigeria and Kenya.

== Programs ==
Turing College offers training in the following fields:

- Data Analytics
- Data Science & AI
- Digital Marketing & Analytics
- AI Engineering
- Software & AI Engineering
- AI for Business Analytics
- AI Ethics
- AI Literacy

Programs are typically self-paced and range from several months to two years. The curriculum is developed in collaboration with external industry partners. Instruction is delivered through an in-house learning platform that supports a project-based learning approach. Students complete practical assignments reviewed by mentors and peers, with the methodology influenced by Bloom's 2 sigma problem findings on individualized instruction.

== Recognition ==
Turing College was included in Sifted’s 2024 ranking of the fastest-growing startups in the Baltics and Eastern Europe, where it placed second regionally and 17th in Europe.

In 2025, Course Report included Turing College in its list of ‘Best European Bootcamps of 2025’.

== See also ==
- Online school
- Coding bootcamp
- Distance education
- Career and Technical Education
- Educational technology
- Y Combinator
