= Dev Bootcamp =

19-week coding bootcamp

- San Francisco, California, Chicago, Illinois, New York City, New York, Seattle, Washington, Austin, Texas, San Diego, California; USA

Information
- Type: Private
- Established: 2012; 14 years ago
- Founders: Shereef Bishay, Jesse Farmer, and Dave Hoover
- Closed: 2017
- Faculty: 40
- Enrollment: 450 (per year)
- Campus: Urban
- Owner: Kaplan, Inc.
- Website: devbootcamp.com

Dev Bootcamp was an immersive 19-week coding bootcamp founded by Shereef Bishay, Jesse Farmer, and Dave Hoover in February 2012. It was designed to make graduates job-ready by the end of the program. Dev Bootcamp was headquartered in San Francisco, California, with additional locations Seattle, Chicago, New York City, Washington, D.C., San Diego, and Austin. It was acquired by for-profit education company Kaplan, Inc in 2014. Dev Bootcamp closed in 2017.

== The program ==
The program was 9 weeks of remote work (called Phase 0) and then 9 weeks of intensive onsite training in professional web development, including Ruby on Rails, HTML5, CSS, and JavaScript. A week of career training followed the 18 weeks of technical training. The program took students with little or no prior programming experience and taught them the fundamentals of computer programming. The program's goal was to develop the necessary skills within the students to make them job-ready for an entry-level developer position. According to Hoover, applicants to the 2013 Chicago programs had varied backgrounds, ranging from students with Master's degrees in computer science to a Starbucks barista.

The program valued learning by building and doing; in contrast to traditional classrooms, Dev Bootcamp students worked through a series of programming challenges, usually working in pairs or small groups, which culminated in a final group project. The tuition costs were $13,950 in the New York and San Francisco locations, and $12,700 for the Chicago, San Diego, Austin, and Seattle locations for the 9-week, 40-hour-per-week program. Core class hours were weekdays 9am-6pm in San Francisco and 8am-5pm in Chicago. However, most students stayed nights and weekends, which amounted to an approximate 70–80 hours per week. Dev Bootcamp organized hiring days for technology companies to interview students. They then collected a referral fee from employers that hire their graduates, and they passed along part of that fee to the graduate in the form of a hiring bonus.

In 2015, Dev Bootcamp tested a remote teaching model in a pilot program in Columbus, Ohio, which was canceled after the first round even though four of its 14 enrollees had already found jobs. The company announced it was closing its doors on July 23, 2017 via a press release.

=== Phases ===
The program was divided into three core phases, each lasting three weeks. In the first phase, students learned some of the fundamentals of computer programming in Ruby, including algorithms and database querying. The next phase introduced front-end technologies and combined them with previously learned material. The final phase brought everything full-circle with the Ruby on Rails framework. In this phase, students built a web application from scratch.

Students were also required to remotely complete 9 weeks of preparation material before the on-location courses began.

== Reception ==
After its founding in 2012, Dev Bootcamp was featured in the Chicago Tribune, Fast Company, Business Insider, TechCrunch, and Inc. Magazine. According to the company, 95% of the individuals who had graduated from Dev Bootcamp San Francisco that year found jobs, with an average starting salary of more than $85,000.

== See also ==
- Web development
