= Makers Academy =

Coordinates: 51.517°N 0.073°W

- United Kingdom; UK

Information
- Type: Academy
- Established: 2012
- Founders: Evgeny Shadchnev & Rob Johnson
- Faculty: 85
- Enrollment: 200 (per year)
- Campus: Zetland House, 5-25 Scrutton Street, EC2A 4HJ
- Website: https://makers.tech/

Makers Academy (Makers) is a 16-week coding bootcamp in London, England. It was founded by Rob Johnson and Evgeny Shadchnev in December 2012.

== Programme ==
Makers Academy (Makers) teaches students with varying levels of prior experience computer programming and the fundamentals of web development. The program aims to help students develop skills to secure a role as a junior developer upon graduation. The course covers professional web development technologies such as Ruby on Rails, HTML5, CSS, JavaScript, jQuery, SQL, Ajax and softer skills, including Object-oriented design, Test Driven Development, Agile Methodology and version control with Git. The main course is preceded by a 4-week, part-time, online 'pre-course', as a prerequisite. The selective application process encourages applications from students with significant prior experience. The boot camp offers a limited number of free places to those who cannot afford to pay the usual £8,500 fee (US$8,300) through scholarships, funded by the Department for Education's Skills Bootcamp programme.

The program adopts a "learn by doing" approach, achieved largely through self-directed, project-based work. Students are encouraged to work in pairs on practical coding challenges, completing weekly tests, which culminates in a final project which is presented to hiring partners on "Demo Day". The organization claims to support 100% of its graduates into jobs, though data to verify this claim is not publicly available. Students who have graduated are often put forward for roles by the Academy, which has relationships with employers like Marks & Spencer, Sky, The Financial Times and Deloitte Digital.

== Reception ==
Makers Academy has been featured on Sky News, in The Guardian, The Independent, Tech City News, Forbes, MadeInShoreditch, ComputerWeekly, StartupBook, and TechWeekEurope.
