= Leo Grand =

American computer software coder

- Other name: Journeyman
- Occupation: coder
- Employer: MetLife (until 2011)
- Notable work: Trees for Cars app

Leo Grand is a coder who developed the mobile app "Trees for Cars."

Grand lost his job at MetLife in 2011, as well as his home, being forced on his own in New York City. In August 2013, while homeless, he was offered a choice between $100 or coding lessons, by Patrick McConlogue. Grand opted for the lessons.

Grand was able to learn coding, leading to the launch of "Trees for Cars," his own mobile app. The application has the aim of being environmentally beneficial. The app went on sale for $0.99.

In May 2014, a follow-up by Business Insider revealed that Grand, although earning a little under $10,000 from the app, was still homeless. A 2015 follow-up by Mashable found that Grand continues to be homeless. He has less enthusiasm in coding, but wants to get back into it someday.
