= Hack Reactor =

Private schools in the United States

- Remote Only

Information
- Type: Private
- Established: 2012
- Founders: Anthony Phillips, Shawn Drost, Marcus Phillips, and Douglas Calhoun
- Accreditation: None
- Website: www.galvanize.com/hack-reactor

Hack Reactor is a software engineering coding bootcamp education program founded in San Francisco in 2012. The program is remote-only and offered in 12-week beginner full-time and 19-week intermediate full-time formats.

The program has been described as, "optimized for people who want to be software engineers as their main, day-to-day work. Their life's work." The curriculum focuses on JavaScript and associated technologies including the Relational/NoSQL databases, Node.js, Express.js, jQuery, React, Redux.

In 2015 Hack Reactor acquired Austin-based MakerSquare as "their first deal in a plan to develop a network of coding bootcamps" in an effort to "make a large dent in transforming the old education system into one that focuses on student outcomes." The following month, a pair of Hack Reactor alumni partnered with the company to open Telegraph Academy "to teach software engineering to under-represented minorities" and create a "growing community of diverse software engineers."

In November 2016, Hack Reactor rebranded all of its schools to share the Hack Reactor name.

In 2018, Hack Reactor was acquired by Galvanize.

In January 2020, Galvanize was acquired by K12, Inc., a for-profit education company, for $165 million. In November 2020, K12 was rebranded as Stride, Inc.

In 2021, Hack Reactor ceased offering in-person programs and became remote-only.

On October 20, 2023, Hack Reactor ceased all part-time programs effective immediately.

== Admissions process ==
Hack Reactor's admissions standard has been described as "highly selective, only accepting ten to fifteen percent of applicants for each cohort." Though many applicants who do not pass the first admission interview are encouraged to try again when they feel they are better prepared.

The technical interview tests both technical skills (JavaScript basics such as objects, arrays, functions and the ability to solve basic coding problems using JavaScript) and soft skills, such as the student’s willingness and ability to learn.

Hack Reactor has created financial partnerships with SkillsFund and Climb Credit and to assist students with paying tuition.

== Course Structure ==
Accepted students are assigned pre-course work, which takes "at least 50-80 hours" and is due prior to the start of their cohort.

Hack Reactor’s course is offered in 12-week full-time and 9-month part-time formats. During the first half of the program, students work in pairs on two-day “sprints.” Pair and group work helps teach communication and collaboration skills. During this part of the course, the day typically starts with a “toy problem,” which is a programming challenge designed to illustrate core concepts. This is followed by a lecture in which the instructor frequently checks in with students to assess how well they understand the material. The JavaScript tools and technologies taught at Hack Reactor include Node, MongoDB, Express, React, and ES6. The goal of this part of the course is for students to become “autonomous learners and programmers.”

The second half of the course focuses on projects. Students complete coding projects of their own design, using whatever languages and frameworks they choose. Students often adopt technologies not taught in the course using “fundamentals and self-teaching methods” taught in the first half of the course.

== Student Outcomes ==
Co-Founder Shawn Drost says that Hack Reactor is "committed to being the leading coding immersive in terms of quality, student experience and student outcomes." In 2017, they joined a 501(c)(6) non-profit organization called the Council on Integrity in Results Reporting (CIRR) as a founding member. CIRR requires members to report "the outcomes of every enrolled student must be reported in a single, simple, clear report" using common standards and follow "CIRR Truth in Advertising policies".

Hack Reactor releases student outcome reports in six-month intervals. The most-recently released outcome report covers 2021.

== Hack Reactor Remote ==
In July 2014, Hack Reactor launched an online program, Hack Reactor Remote. This program has the same curriculum, course structure and teaching method as Hack Reactor’s onsite program. Students attend and participate in the lectures at the same time as the other students, work on the same assignments, and benefit from the same job search and placement resources as the onsite program. Hack Reactor's Remote program has comparable student outcomes to its in-person campuses.

In 2017, Hack Reactor began offering a part-time version of their remote program, known as Hack Reactor Remote Part-Time.

In 2022, Hack Reactor became remote-only and stopped offering in-person programs.

== MakerSquare ==
In January 2015, Hack Reactor acquired coding bootcamp MakerSquare, which had locations in Austin and San Francisco. MakerSquare has since expanded into Los Angeles and New York City.

MakerSquare was founded in 2013 by Harsh Patel, Shaan Shah, Shehzan Devani, and Ravi Parikh.

MakerSquare has the same admissions process, hiring partner network, and the same curriculum with a few small modifications. In November 2016, they rebranded to share the Hack Reactor name.

== Social Responsibility ==
=== Code.7370 ===
In collaboration with The Last Mile, Hack Reactor launched Code.7370, a coding program in San Quentin State Prison. Inmates have to apply to be a part of the program. Once accepted, they learn HTML, CSS, Python and JavaScript for 8 hours a day, 4 days a week. Hack Reactor instructors volunteered as teachers. In addition to class time students are also given time to work on personal projects. Because inmates are not permitted access to the internet, Code.7370 operates by a proprietary programming platform that simulates a normal web environment. The goal of Code.7370 is to reduce recidivism and help felons reenter the workforce.

=== ReBootKAMP ===
Hack Reactor helped launch ReBootKAMP, a coding bootcamp in Jordan that focuses on Syrian refugees. ReBootKAMP uses Hack Reactor’s curriculum, and received volunteer assistance from Hack Reactor staff and alumni. ReBootKAMP executives also received training on coding bootcamp best practices from Hack Reactor and Reactor Core.

=== Hola<code/> ===
In December 2017, Hack Reactor supported the launch of Hola<code/>, a coding bootcamp based in Mexico City focused on bringing new opportunities to recent returnees. Hola<code/> is powered by Hack Reactor curriculum and Hack Reactor alumni have been part of their teaching team.

== See also ==
- Web Development
- MakerSquare
