= Jean Zu =

Chinese-Canadian engineer

- Education: University of Manitoba (Ph.D.); Tsinghua University (B.S., M.S.)
- Known for: modelling and simulation of nonlinear vibration systems
- Scientific career
- Fields: Mechanical Engineering
- Workplaces: Stevens Institute of Technology
- Website: www.stevens.edu/profile/jzu

Jean Zu is a Chinese-Canadian engineer and elected Fellow of the American Association for the Advancement of Science. Since 2017, she has served as the dean of the Charles V. Schaefer, Jr. School of Engineering & Science at Stevens Institute of Technology in Hoboken, New Jersey.

== Education ==
Zu earned at B.S. (1984) and M.S. (1986) degree from Tsinghua University. In 1987, she began working on her Ph.D. from University of Manitoba completing her studies in 1993. All of her degrees were in mechanical engineering.

== Career ==
In 1994, Zu secured a tenured track teaching position at the University of Toronto in Mechanical and Industrial Engineering. She was promoted to associate professor in 1999, full professor in 2004, and department chair in 2009. Making history has the first woman and Asian department chair.

Zu holds 4 patents and has created over 300 refereed papers, 160 journal papers, and secured millions of dollars in grants for research.

In 2017, she was named the dean of the Charles V. Schaefer, Jr School of Engineering and Science at Stevens Institute of Technology and was reappointed as the Lore E. Feiler Dean for an additional 5 year term in 2022. The engineering school has eight academic departments, 50 majors, 170 faculty, and 8000 students (roughly half undergraduates vs graduate students). The school ranks in the top 50 with 90% graduation rates and approximately 97% employment within 6 months of graduation she is promoting science, technology, engineering and mathematics fields. She currently works on wave propagation of functional graded cylindrical nanoshells.

== Professional Service ==
Zu has been involved with American Society of Mechanical Engineers (ASME), Canadian Society for Mechanical Engineering (CSME), and Engineering Institute of Canada (EIC) since 2004. She has served in numerous leadership roles, including:

- Associate Editor, ASME Journal of Vibration and Acoustics, 2007-2013
- President, EIC, 2012-2014.
- President, CSME, 2006-2008,
- NSERC Grant Selection Committee, 2004-2007

== Personal life ==
Zu was born in China, where she earned her undergraduate and master's degree.
