= App Academy =

Coding bootcamp in San Francisco

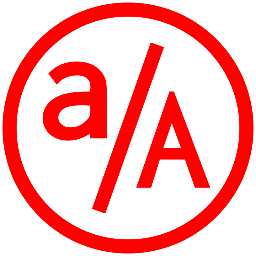
- Established: 2012
- Location: San Francisco, CA, USA; 37°47′29″N 122°23′37″W
- Website: http://www.appacademy.io

App Academy is a San Francisco based coding bootcamp founded by Ned Ruggeri and Kush Patel in 2012.

== Overview ==
App Academy describes their program as having a "job-guaranteed" financing model where payment is deferred until after the completion of the course. App Academy publicly offers to waive payment for their program if a student does not find relevant employment within the first year of completing the course. The median starting salary for graduates starting cohorts in 2018 and accepting a full-time offer in San Francisco or New York City (within the following 12 months) was $101,000.

== The Program ==
App Academy, as of 2014, reported an acceptance rate of about 5%. During the admissions process, students are required to complete introductory level coding work to show their programming potential. Applicants do not need to have prior coding experience. Students are, however, expected to complete preparatory work before the formal course begins. The curriculum covers full stack web development and primarily focuses on Ruby on Rails, JavaScript, React, Redux, Flux, JQuery, and SQL. Students also take weekly assessments until the project portion of the course begins. Students who fail more than one assessment (score < 80%) are dismissed from the course.

App Academy's '16-week' program is broken into 3 sections with over 500 hours of formal instructional time.

Weeks 1-7: Introductory level programming concepts. Ruby, Rails, and SQL.

Weeks 8-11: JavaScript, React, Redux, Flux, etc.

Weeks 12-16: Full stack projects, advanced algorithms and job search. The job search curriculum pertains to resume help, whiteboarding, technical interview training, and salary negotiation. Students are also required to work on their projects on-site for an additional 2 weeks after graduation. This increases the total commitment length to about 18 weeks.

Students are given a lecture at the beginning of every session, with the majority of time being allocated to projects and pair programming. 2-3 teaching assistants are generally on-site to provide guidance as necessary. Due to wait times for assistance, students are encouraged to use their own resources.

App Academy also offers a paid tutoring program (Bootcamp Prep) for potential applicants preparing for the admissions process.

== Founding ==
Ned Ruggeri and Kush Patel met at the University of Chicago, where Ruggeri studied Mathematics and Patel majored in Economics. Prior to App Academy, Ruggeri worked for Google on the search engine indexing team and Patel worked at a hedge fund in Mumbai. In an interview with Patel, he explains the initial structure of App Academy, stating the need to teach "as much language and framework agnostic software development as we can." Kush reported to Yahoo News stating the need to "give [students] real-world skills they can use and actually get them a job."
