= Code Ninjas =

Coding academy

- Formation: 2016; 10 years ago
- Founder: David Graham
- Founded at: Pearland, Texas
- Type: Privately Held
- Headquarters: Houston, Texas
- Owner: David Graham
- Website: https://www.codeninjas.com/

Code Ninjas is a for-profit educational organization specializing in teaching coding to kids, and is the largest kids coding franchise in the world with over 400 locations open and operating in three countries. It is headquartered in Pearland, Texas. It was founded by David Graham in 2016, inspired by watching his son learn Tae Kwon Do. It has locations in the United States, Canada, and the United Kingdom.

== Structure ==
Code Ninjas buildings are separated into classrooms and lobbies. The lobbies are for parents to pick up and drop off their kids and have free Wi-Fi, refreshments, and games or toys for the kids to play with while on break or waiting for their parents. Meanwhile, the classrooms (referred to as dojos) have giant desks and are restricted for only Code Senseis (the educators), and Ninjas (the students), aged 7–15, who are given laptops to do programming. Each of the kids start out at white belt and work their way up the "Path of Enlightenment" to Gold Belt. In the "Create" program, different belts have different coding languages. For example, White, Yellow, Orange, and Green belts learn block coding, using Microsoft's MakeCode Arcade. Blue, Purple, Brown, Red and Black belt also uses MakeCode Arcade but instead uses JavaScript in Make Code Arcade. Their previous program utilized a Konva based game engine, blue belts (now red belts) would learn LuaU, Roblox's own version of Lua. Bronze, silver, platinum, and gold belts learn C# with Unity. In gold belt, the ninjas are directed to create their own game through the Unity platform. These games are then approved and uploaded to the code ninjas website. Throughout the curriculum, ninjas learn about computer science concepts such as control flow, object-oriented programming, and many other common programming concepts.

== Belts ==
Code Ninjas operates on a belt system, similar to karate. Ninjas begin at white belt, then progressing to yellow belt, orange belt, green belt, blue belt, purple belt, brown belt, red belt, black belt, bronze belt, silver belt, platinum belt, and finally, gold belt. Each belt has its own curriculum, and each belt usually uses different coding programs and types of coding. Each belt progressively gets harder and difficult, white belt being the easiest and gold belt being the hardest. Although belts were originally represented through physicals electronic wristbands which would allow the ninja to "scan into" the dojo, Code Ninjas now does not supply physical bands and instead digitally keeps track of the ninjas' accomplished belts. Some locations still provide wristbands as a form of an accomplishment rather than a key to login for their sessions.

== Summer Camps ==
During the summer, Code Ninjas offers camps alongside normal coding classes, where the parents drop their children off for a half-day class during the weekdays, either in the morning or in the afternoon. The content of these camps mainly focuses on programming skills, usually coding or other game development aspects in either Minecraft or Roblox; however, other camps such as leaning how to become a YouTuber focus on improving students' computing abilities through other means, such as content creation. Other summer camps offered by Code Ninjas include 3D design and print with Tinkercad, 3D animation with Blender as well as various Python camps.
