= Nanit =

American technology start-up company

Nanit is an American technology start-up company that develops baby monitor devices connected through its mobile application. The camera captures the video recording of the child and analyzes the footage and shares insights based on the movement of the baby. Nanit was founded by Tor Ivry, Andrew Berman and Assaf Glazer. Sarah McCollum Dorsett, previously an executive at Bed Bath & Beyond, Century 21, and Bloomingdales.com, has served as Nanit's Chief Executive Officer (CEO) since 2019. Since 2024, Anushka Salinas is the CEO of Nanit. The company is headquartered in New York City and received $6.6 million seed funding round in June 2016.
