= Cornell Tech =

Graduate school and research center in New York City

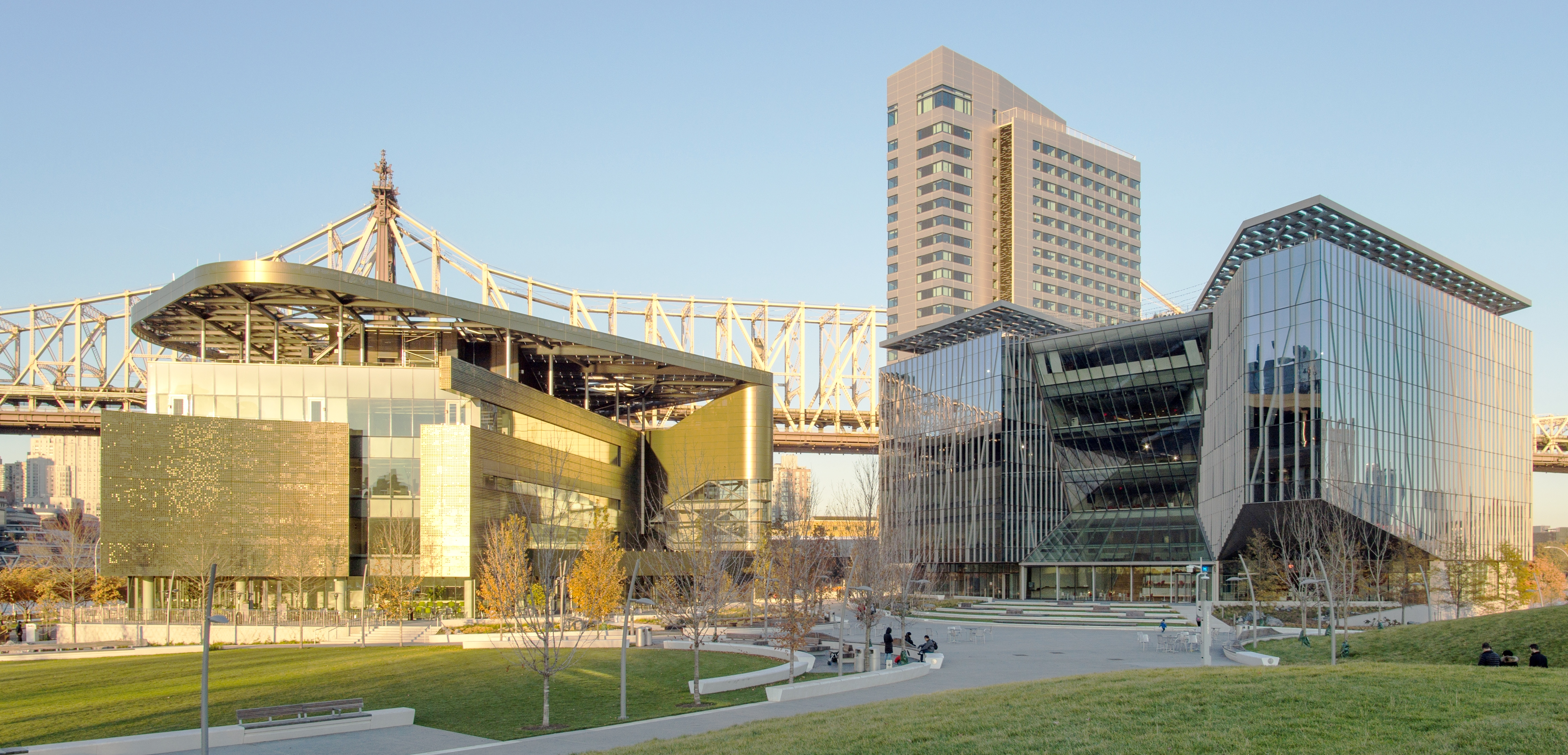
- The Bloomberg Center, the House, and the Tata Innovation Center
- Type: Private; Graduate campus
- Established: 2012
- Parent institution: Cornell University
- Dean: Greg Morrisett
- Location: 2 West Loop Road, Roosevelt Island, New York City, New York, U.S. 40.755811°N 73.956296°W
- Campus: Urban
- Language: English
- Website: tech.cornell.edu

Cornell Tech is a graduate campus and research center of Cornell University on Roosevelt Island in Manhattan, New York City. It provides courses in technology, business, and design, and includes the Jacobs Technion-Cornell Institute, a partnership between Cornell University and the Technion – Israel Institute of Technology. Cornell Tech houses the one-year MBA program of the Cornell Johnson Graduate School of Management and serves as the second-year campus for students in the dual-campus (1+1) MBA track, which combines study in Ithaca and New York City with a focus on technology, management, and entrepreneurship. Additionally, Cornell Tech has PhD curricula in fields such as Computer Science, Electrical and Computer Engineering, Operations Research, Biomedical Engineering, and Information Science. The campus also houses coursework for Cornell University’s dual degree options, including the MBA/MEng program and a JD/MEng program, blending business, law, and engineering. Lastly, Cornell Tech offers Master of Science (MS) programs in Computer Science, Electrical and Computer Engineering, Data Science, and Master of Laws (LLM) focused on technology, law and entrepreneurship through Cornell Law School.

Cornell Tech arose from an economic development initiative of Michael Bloomberg's mayoral administration in 2008. The initiative sought to attract another engineering school to the city in the hope that it would produce entrepreneurial engineers who would in turn start job-creating companies. Seven bids were submitted for the competition, with the administration ultimately selecting Cornell/Technion's bid. As proposed, Cornell Tech would create 28,000 jobs, including 8,000 for academic staff. It would also be able to create 600 companies, leading to $23 billion in economic benefits and an additional $1.4 billion in taxes during its first three decades of operation.

Cornell Tech began operations in 2012 at a temporary site, the New York City offices of Google at 111 Eighth Avenue in the Chelsea neighborhood of Manhattan, while the permanent campus was built. The Roosevelt Island campus's 5-acre (2.0 ha) first phase opened on September 13, 2017.

== History ==
In 2008, the administration of then-New York City Mayor Michael Bloomberg recruited Steven Strauss, an American economist and former McKinsey & Company management consultant, to oversee a series of research projects looking at the future of New York City's economy in the context of global economic trends. The analysis concluded that New York had significant opportunities in the high tech sector and recommended a series of initiatives to better capitalize on these developments. These recommendations included, but were not limited to: creation of a string of incubators, an early stage investment fund, NYC Big Apps. The success of these recommendations would hinge upon quality and quantity of technology talent in New York City.

In response to this recommendation, Mayor Bloomberg launched a competition to build an applied sciences campus in New York City with a focus on entrepreneurship and job creation. In December 2010, the city requested expressions of interest from leading universities. Eighteen universities responded. Next, in July 2011, New York City published a request for proposals for the construction of an applied sciences campus. The winner would receive $100 million and free land; Roosevelt Island, Governors Island, Downtown Brooklyn, and the Brooklyn Navy Yard were discussed as locations.

Seven formal proposals were submitted. They were the Amity University bid for Governors Island; the joint Carnegie Mellon University and Steiner Studios bid for Brooklyn Navy Yard; the Columbia University bid for Manhattanville; the joint Cornell University and Technion–Israel Institute of Technology bid for Roosevelt Island; the six-way bid of New York University, University of Toronto, University of Warwick, Indian Institute of Technology Bombay, City University of New York, and Carnegie Mellon in Downtown Brooklyn; the four-way bid for New York Genome Center, Mount Sinai School of Medicine, Rockefeller University, and State University of New York at Stony Brook in Midtown Manhattan; and the joint bid for Stanford University and City College of New York at Roosevelt Island. Stanford University and Massachusetts Institute of Technology were favored to win the competition, and when MIT dropped out, Stanford, which had partnered with the City College of New York, became the favorite. Cornell and Technion's joint proposal, combining Technion's reputation as the "MIT of Israel" and Cornell's presence in New York State and its land grant economic development mission, was developed in secret, in a meeting in Beijing and another three day meeting at the Cornell Club of New York in New York City, and it was made public on October 18, 10 days before the submission deadline. The New York City Economic Development Corporation awarded the project to the Cornell/Technion bid in December 2011, after Stanford pulled out of negotiations.

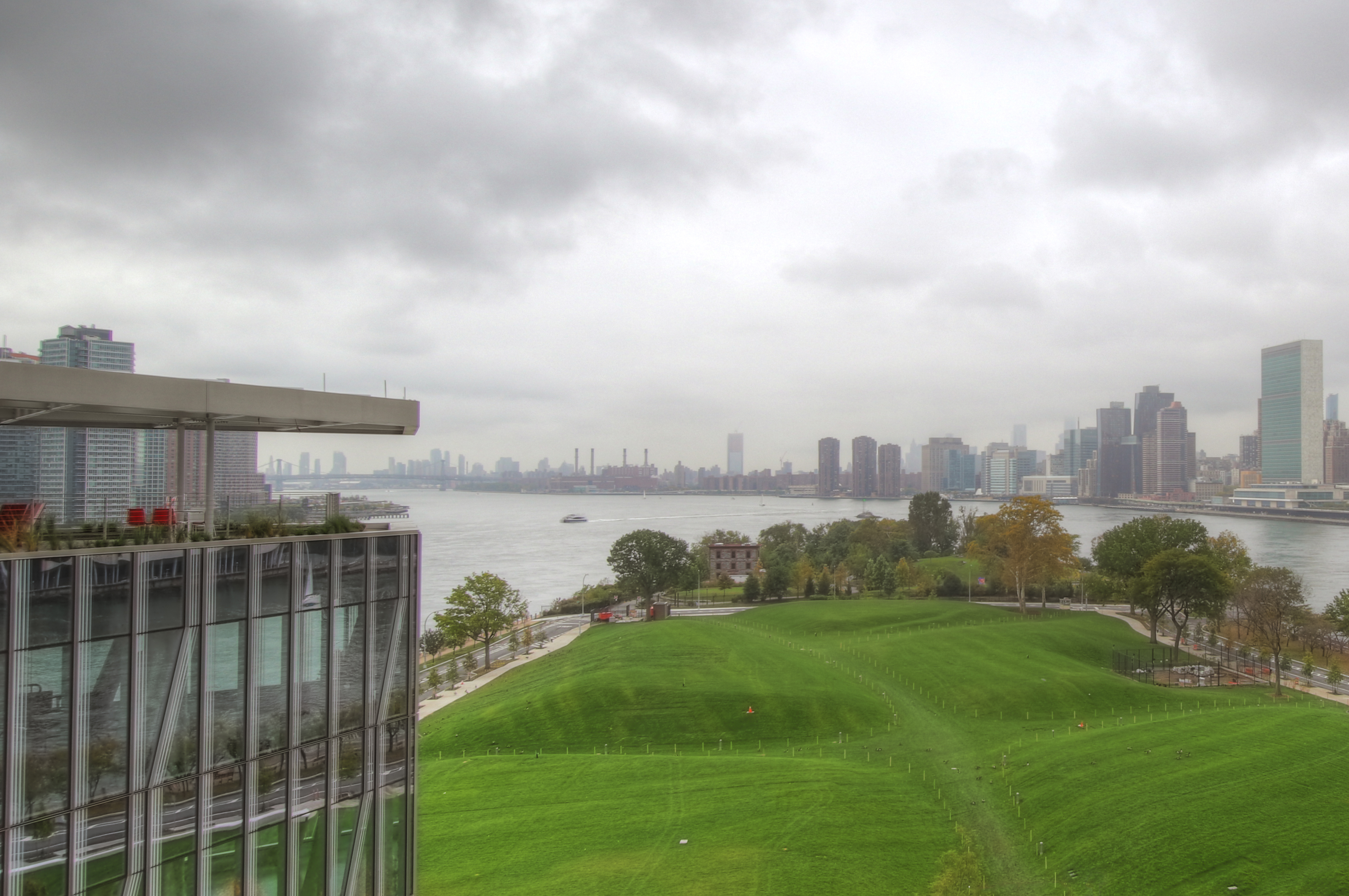
Part of the Cornell Tech site, as viewed from one of its buildings

The Cornell/Technion bid was ultimately chosen because of its detail and scope of benefits, as well as the viability of the partnership between the two bidders. According to Crain's New York, the Cornell/Technion bid promised to create 28,000 jobs, of which 20,000 would be in construction and 8,000 would be those of academics at the campus. The bid would also be able to incubate 600 companies, create $23 billion of economic benefits, and garner $1.4 billion in taxes for the first 30 years of operation. The plan also provided for 200 professors and 2,000 students inhabiting some 2,000,000 square feet (190,000 m^{2}) of campus space. The project was estimated to cost $2 billion to build. Cornell declined to build on potential sites in Brooklyn Navy Yard and Governors Island due to the lack of transit access to either location.

When plans for the Cornell Tech campus on Roosevelt Island were first publicly announced, there was some opposition from Roosevelt Island residents who disliked that the construction traffic would potentially disrupt the quality of life there, as well as from pro-Palestinian activists who opposed the partnership between Cornell and Technion. Additionally, there were concerns that the campus's construction might lead to a decrease in the amount of affordable housing units, since many of the island's affordable housing units, built under the Mitchell-Lama Housing Program in the 1970s, were becoming market rate housing without any of the maximum-rent restrictions provided for in the Mitchell-Lama program.

Cornell Tech began operations in 2012 at a temporary site, the New York City offices of Google at 111 Eighth Avenue in Chelsea. Google's co-founders, Sergey Brin and Larry Page, agreed to donate some of the building's space to Cornell Tech despite their alma mater Stanford University losing the Roosevelt Island campus bid.

=== Financial contributions ===
There were several major gifts to Cornell Tech. The largest was a $350 million gift from Atlantic Philanthropies, founded by Charles Feeney (Cornell class of 1956), the owner of Duty Free Shops. There was also a $133 million gift by Qualcomm founder Irwin M. Jacobs (Cornell class of 1954, BEE class of 1956) and his wife Joan (Cornell class of 1954). In addition, Verizon Communications provided $50 million for an executive education center, and Bloomberg Philanthropies provided a $100 million gift. As part of Bloomberg Philanthropies' gift, the main academic building was renamed after the daughters of former Mayor Bloomberg, who was also the head of the foundation. Finally, Robert Frederick Smith, of the Cornell class of 1985, provided some funds to provide scholarships for students who are ethnic- and racial-minorities, part of the undergrad engineering program, and studying to be in the engineering field.

Under the terms of the bid with Cornell, Technion could not use any funding to pay for the campus, as that would have involved using funds from the Israeli government.

=== Construction and usage ===
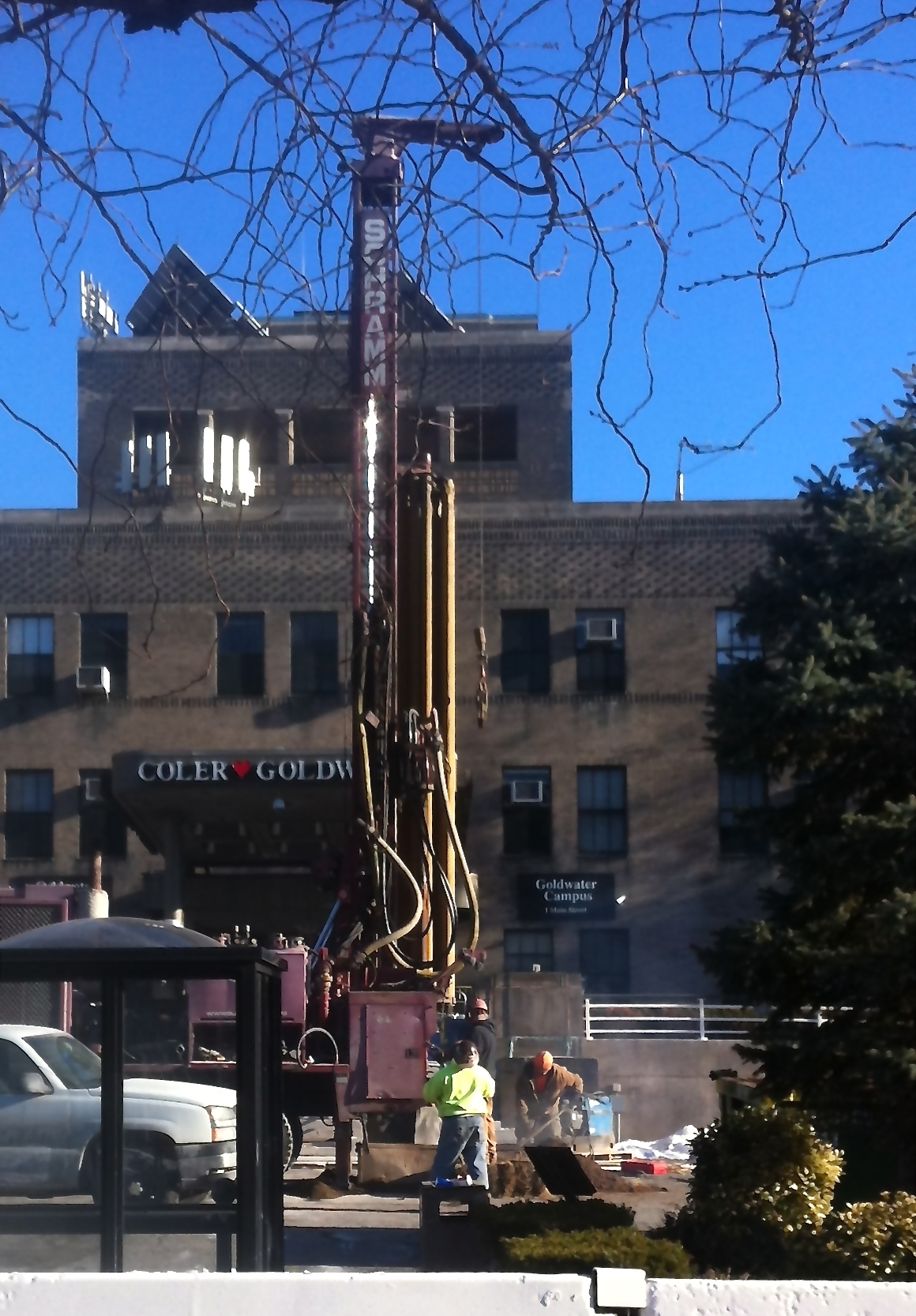
Demolition of Goldwater Hospital

Construction of the campus required demolition of the Coler-Goldwater Specialty Hospital's south campus and remediation of polluted land. City officials said they did not have plans to close the north campus of the hospital. Demolition began in March 2014, with the debris being removed by barge.

During the demolition of the hospital, Cornell rescued several large murals at the hospital that were originally commissioned by the Federal Art Project, a subdivision of President Roosevelt's Works Progress Administration (WPA). The Herbert F. Johnson Museum of Art at Cornell University hosted an exhibit featuring these murals from January to May 2016. These murals by Ilya Bolotowsky, Albert Swinden, and Joseph Rugolo, were set to be installed in the campus in the long term, and were ultimately installed in the Bloomberg Center.

Construction of the House, the residential building, began in 2015, with the Hudson Companies and the Related Companies as the developers. Forest City Ratner was hired to build the Bridge, later renamed the Tata Innovation Center.

In June 2017, the school said that three buildings on Roosevelt Island—the Tata Innovation Center (Ratan Naval Tata, Cornell Class of 1975), the House, and the Bloomberg Center—would be ready for the start of the fall 2017 semester. The first buildings opened on September 13, 2017. The campus's initial occupants consisted of 30 professors and 300 students. Subsequently, in March 2018, construction began on the 18-story, 244-room Graduate Hotel at Cornell Tech. The hotel was designed by Norwegian architecture firm Snøhetta, with Stonehill Taylor as the architect of record.

On August 1, 2019, Greg Morrisett was named the Jack and Rilla Neafsey Dean and Vice Provost of Cornell Tech. He was previously the dean of Cornell's Faculty of Computing and Information Science (CIS), and is regarded as an international expert in software security. Morrisett succeeded Cornell Tech's founding dean, Dan Huttenlocher, who was appointed as the inaugural dean of the Massachusetts Institute of Technology's Schwarzman College of Computing.

The Graduate Hotel at Cornell Tech was completed in June 2021. The hotel closed abruptly in November 2025, after its operator defaulted on loans. This prompted the hotel's mortgage lender to file a lawsuit in early 2026. Cornell hired HEI Hotels + Resorts to operate the hotel in October 2026.

== Campus ==
Skidmore, Owings & Merrill designed the campus master plan and James Corner was in charge of landscape design. The full campus, due to be completed in 2037, will span 12 acres (5 ha). All the buildings on campus were designed to be energy-efficient. Jaros, Baum & Bolles provided engineering support for the master plan, as well as MEP and related services for the Tata Innovation Center. During planning for the campus, it was anticipated that all its maintenance systems "such as heating, cooling, ventilation, lighting and fire safety" would be automated. The buildings would contain modern technology such as virtual reality sets and televisions onto which laptops could stream or project. As part of a long-term sustainability plan, 20% of the campus was required to be undeveloped or open public space, and its buildings had to be built on a 500-year floodplain, which would have a 0.2% chance of flooding in any single year. The unused southern part of the campus, hosting future phases 2 and 3, was covered with a temporary rock-and-native-plant landscape.

In order to promote mass transit use, the campus itself has no parking lots, instead being interconnected by pedestrian walkways and bikeways. It has connections to Manhattan via the Roosevelt Island Tramway and the New York City Subway at the Roosevelt Island station (F and M trains). The subway and the Q102 bus also provide service to Queens.

=== Phase 1 ===
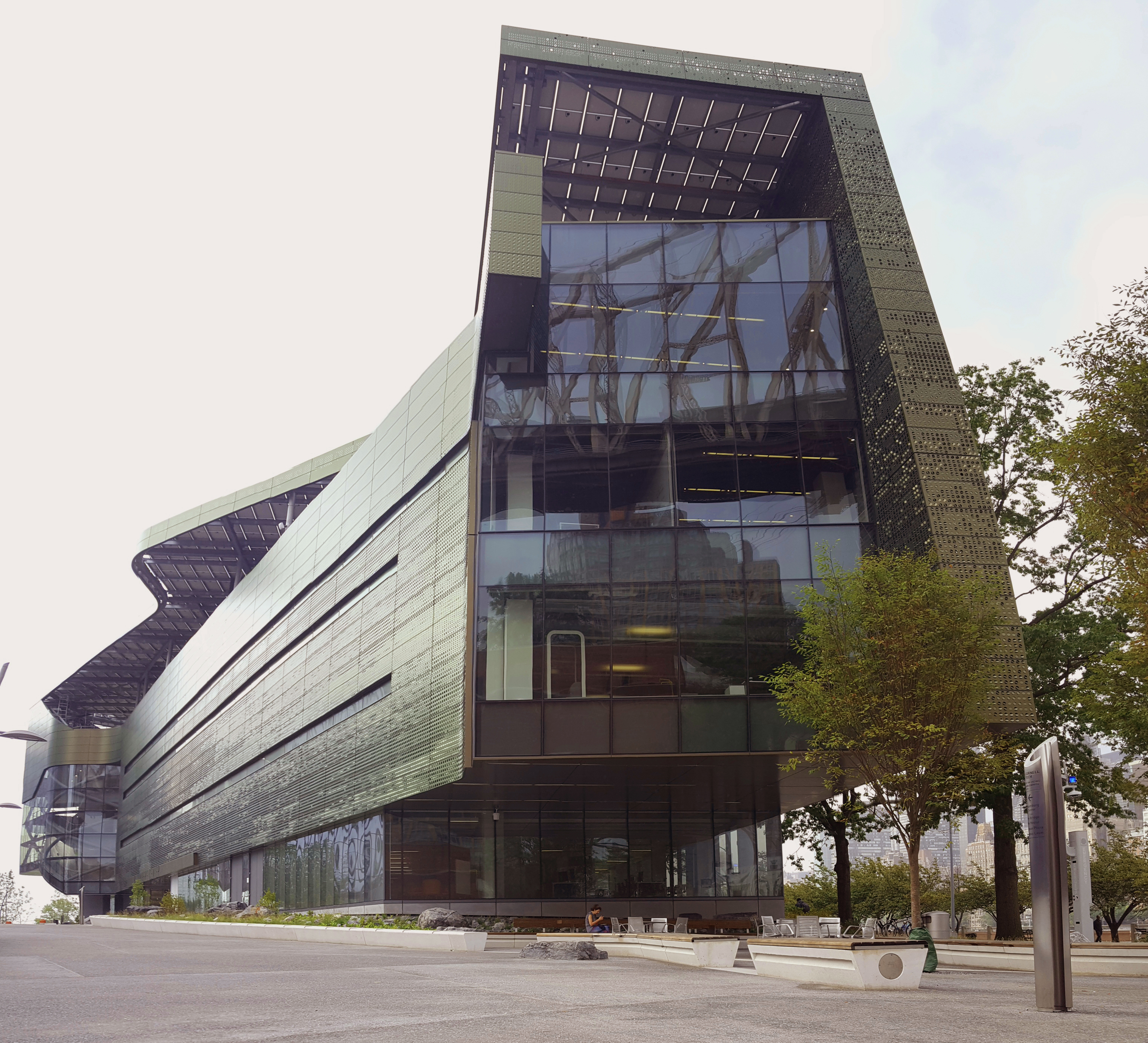
The Bloomberg building

The first of three phases includes four buildings on 5 acres (2.0 ha) of the campus, completed in stages between 2017 and 2021. The Bloomberg Center, the Tata Innovation Center, and the House opened in 2017, while the Executive Education Center and Hotel opened in 2021. They would all be connected by a central pedestrian corridor, later called the "Tech Walk". Planning for the first three buildings was completed in summer 2014.

The main academic building of Phase 1 is called the Bloomberg Center. The $115 million, five-story structure was designed by Morphosis Architects. It was designed as "net-zero energy" building, wherein the building only uses the power it creates on its own. The city's first net-zero building, Bloomberg Center was built with energy-efficiency standards that were more stringent than the Leadership in Energy and Environmental Design standards. As part of its net zero-energy drive, the Bloomberg Center contains a "lilypad" array of 1,465 solar panels on its roof; 80 geothermal wells to draw heat from the ground; color-changing black-and-white discs on its facade that could either absorb or reflect heat; and a rainwater tank with a capacity of 40,000 US gallons (150,000 L). For maximum solar coverage, the taller buildings such as the House would be located to the north of the Bloomberg Center so that the taller buildings' shadows, which face north, would not block the panels. Its 160,000-square-foot (15,000 m^{2}) interior contains a short atrium cutting through the center of the building, aligning with 57th Street across the East River from Roosevelt Island's western shore. Upon its opening, the Bloomberg Center hosted several works of art, including the Goldwater Hospital's WPA murals and two new works by Michael Riedel and Matthew Ritchie.

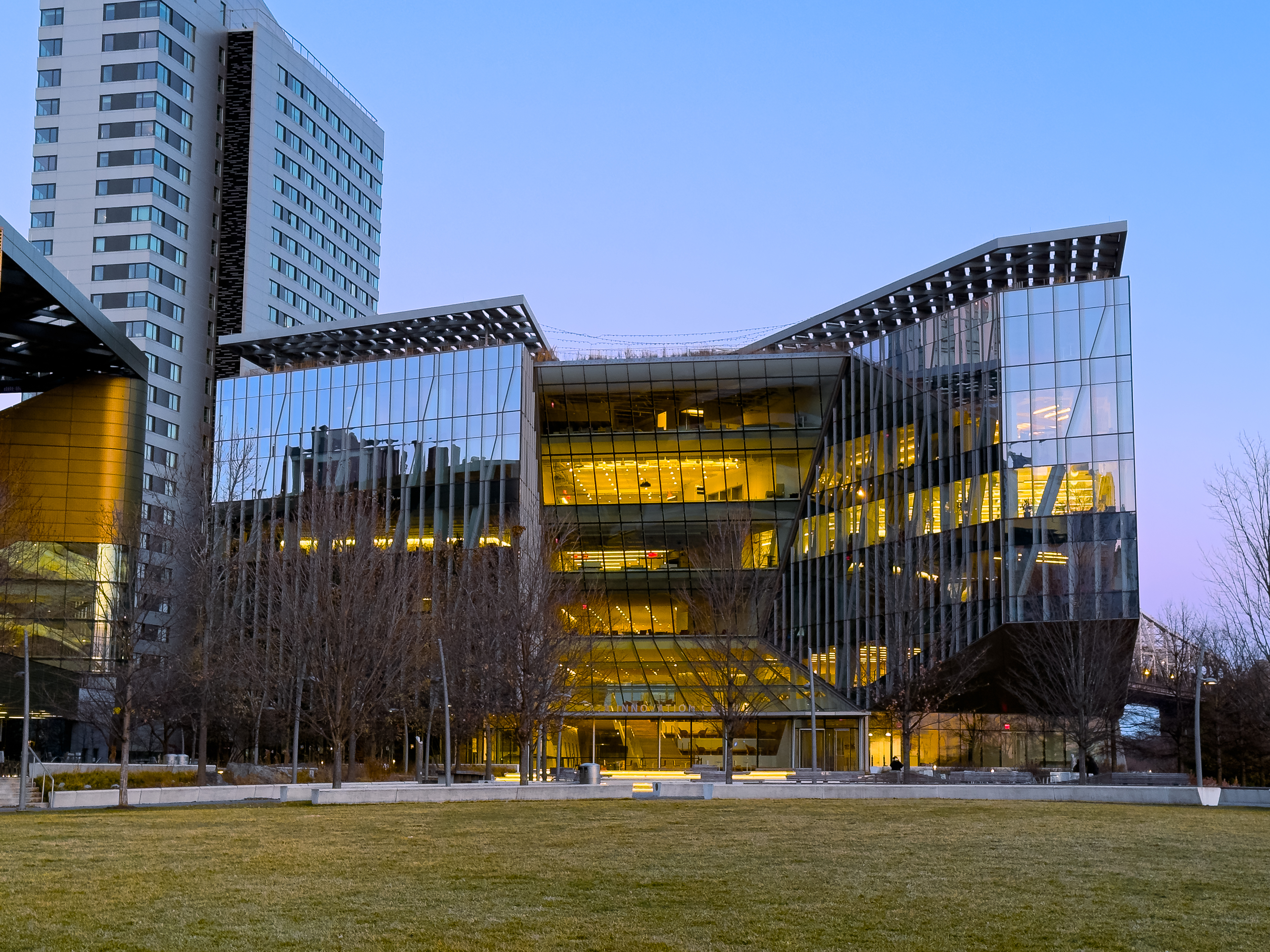
The Tata Innovation Center

The Tata Innovation Center, formerly the Bridge, is a corporate co-location building designed by Weiss/Manfredi. The seven-floor structure is meant primarily as a business incubator for students, faculty, and staff, with 70% of the building being commercially leased and 30% devoted to academic space. The building's 24,000-square-foot (2,200 m^{2}) roof is fitted with solar panels but doubles as an event space.

The House, a 270-foot-tall (82 m), 26-floor residential building, was designed by Handel Architects, who also created each unit's furnishings. The narrow tower contains 270,000 square feet (25,000 m^{2}) of floor area, comprising 350 units. Upon its completion, the House was proposed to be the largest and tallest energy-efficient "passive house" in the world. As it conforms with the Passive House Institute's rigorous standards, its energy output would be 60% to 70% less than if it had been built like a regular, non-energy-efficient high-rise. The House's outer walls include 8-to-13-inch thick (0.20 to 0.33 m) insulated panels, which would retain annually 882 short tons (800,000 kg) of carbon dioxide. The House contains microapartments as well as typical one-, two-, and three-bedroom apartments leased to students at less than market rate.

The Executive Education Center, named for sponsor Verizon, would be completed in 2019. It would have a 300-person hall and four classrooms that could fit 50 to 75 students. There would also be smaller conference rooms spread around the building as well as a buffet hall. Unlike the glass facade designs on the three buildings opened in 2017, the Executive Education Center would have a wood-and-aluminum facade. The center as proposed also includes a 195-room hotel, the island's first. The hotel would serve mainly to provide lodging for the campus's guests, but would also be open to New York City visitors in general. It would have a restaurant and cafe as well as a bar on the roof. The center and hotel would be connected via a corridor, skirting the campus's Tech Walk, and the hotel would also be situated above a public area. According to Cornell Tech's senior director of capital projects, the Executive Education Center and Hotel would serve as Cornell Tech's "front door."

== Curriculum ==
When the campus opened on Roosevelt Island in 2017, about two-thirds of the students were in Cornell's masters programs, and one third were in the Jacobs Technion-Cornell Institute. As of December 2018, Cornell Tech's students and graduates had created over 50 startups between them, and over five hundred graduates had been hired by technology companies.

Cornell masters programs were offered in computer science, electrical and computer engineering, operations research and information engineering, and business administration. Cornell also offered a master of laws in law, technology, and entrepreneurship.

The Jacobs Technion-Cornell Institute is a joint academic venture between Cornell and the Technion that offers two-year master's degrees programs in which students focus on one of two "hubs", "Connective Media" and "Health Tech,"; as of 2017 a third hub called "Urban Life" was planned. Graduates from the Jacobs Institute are awarded degrees by both Cornell and Technion. It also has a postdoc program called "Runway" that supports postdocs seeking to start companies such as Nanit and Data Incubator.

The Jacobs Institute has an intellectual property policy of its own, not subject to Cornell's or Technion's, under which the institute grants licenses to companies started by post-docs using a simple contract and taking only a promissory note for equity valued at the support it gives to post-docs in salary and by being at Cornell Tech.

== Faculty ==
A full list of Cornell Tech faculty members can be found on this page of its official website. A list of its faculty with Wikipedia entries is here: Category:Cornell Tech faculty.

== Critical reception ==
Alexandra Lange, writing for The New Yorker, said that the campus could "give Roosevelt Island the contemporary identity it has never had," but that it could also possibly negate that effect if Cornell Tech were to isolate itself from the city. Justin Davidson of New York magazine wrote that the campus "is so ambitious that its architecture offers a mixture of delight and disappointment". Elizabeth Harris of The New York Times wrote that the campus "has the nascent feel of its own little community." The presence of Cornell Tech was also said to have been an influence in Amazon's initial selection of New York City as one of two locations for Amazon HQ2, even though that plan was later withdrawn.

== See also ==
- List of postgraduate-only institutions
