= The Data Incubator =

American data science education company

- The Data Incubator
- San Francisco, California, New York City, New York, Washington DC; United States

Information
- Type: Data Science Fellowship
- Established: 2014
- Founder: Tianhui Michael Li
- President: Tianhui Michael Li
- Faculty: 60+
- Classes offered: Software Engineering; Machine Learning; Predictive analytics Statistics; Data visualization Database design Hadoop; Distributed computing Parallelization
- Campus: Urban
- Website: https://www.thedataincubator.com

The Data Incubator is a data science education company. It offers corporate data science training and placement services. It is best known for an 8-week educational fellowship preparing students with Master's degrees and PhDs for careers in big data and data science.

== Founding ==
The Data Incubator was founded in 2014 in New York City by Tianhui Michael Li, a former data scientist at local-mobile-social startup Foursquare and Andreessen Horowitz. The company was incubated by Cornell Tech.

The company is best known for an 8-week educational fellowship preparing students with Masters and PhD degrees for careers in big data and data science. The fellowship's expenses are paid for by hiring companies and it remains free for admitted fellows. The program is no longer free, the Data Science program costs 10k for Online and 18K for in-person program. The program has four campuses: New York City, Washington DC, San Francisco, and Online. The program also offers corporate training to Fortune 500 clients.

According to Venture Beat, the program had over 1000 applicants from over 80 universities in its first round and accepted just under 3% of all applicants. The program was selected by Business Insider as one of 15 competitive programs in the world with more competitive admissions than Harvard.

== Growth ==
In 2015, the program launched in Washington, DC and San Francisco. In December 2015, the program established their first international campus in collaboration with The Center of Applied Data Science in Kuala Lumpur, Malaysia with support from the national government.

In 2015 The Data Incubator was ranked second by Data Economy for data science incubators.

In April 2016, the program was launched in the United Kingdom with government support through The Data Lab.

In March, 2018, the company announced a partnership with SAP Fieldglass's Digital Network. The partnership provides Fieldglass's Digital Network with highly sought-after data science talent.

== Data Science in 30 Minutes Online Lecture Series ==
The company hosts an ongoing online lecture series entitled "Data Science in 30 Minutes" featuring leading figures in data science and big data. Participants include:

- scikit-learn core contributor and NYU researcher Andreas Mueller
- SIGKDD and KDD founder Gregory Piatetsky-Shapiro
- Stanford Professor and Databricks founder Matei Zaharia.
- New York Times Pulitzer-nominated journalist Alan Schwarz
- Booz Allen Hamilton Principal Data Scientist Kirk Borne
