= Coding bootcamp =

Software development learning programs

Coding bootcamps are intensive programs of software development. They first appeared in 2011.

== History ==
The first coding bootcamps were opened in 2011.

As of July 2017, there were 95 full-time coding bootcamp courses in the United States. The length of courses typically ranges from between 8 and 36 weeks, with most lasting 10 to 12 (averaging 12.9) weeks.

=== Collaboration with higher education ===
Following the increased popularity of coding bootcamps, some universities have started their own intensive coding programs or partnered with existing private coding bootcamps.

=== Online coding bootcamps ===
There are various online options for online bootcamps. These usually work by matching students with a mentor and are also generally cheaper and more accommodating to specific student needs.

=== Data science bootcamps and fellowships ===
Bootcamps that focus less on full stack development and more on producing data scientists and data engineers are known as data science bootcamps.

=== Matching programs ===
Coding bootcamps may be selective and require minimum skills; some companies aim to help novices learn prerequisite skills and apply to bootcamps.

== Tuition ==
Coding bootcamps can be part-time or online, they may be funded by employers or qualify for student loans. According to a 2017 market research report, tuition ranged from free to $21,000 for a course, with an average tuition of $11,874.

"Deferred Tuition" refers to a payment model in which students pay the school a percentage (18%–22.5%) of their salary for 1–3 years after graduation, instead of upfront tuition.

In Europe, coding bootcamps can be free or a few thousand euros per program. In contrast to formal university education, private offerings for training appear expensive.

On August 16, 2016, the US Department of Education announced up to $17 million in loans or grants for students to study with nontraditional training providers, including coding bootcamps. These grants or loans will be administered through the pilot program, EQUIP which stands for Educational Quality through Innovation Partnerships. Programs must partner with an accredited college and third-party quality assurance entity (QAE) in order to receive federal financial aid.

== Controversy ==
In 2016, there were concerns that partnering private coding bootcamps with federal financial aid could attract less reputable organizations to create coding bootcamp programs. Barriers to entry and exit mean established schools face less competition than in a free market, which can lead to deterioration of quality, and increase in prices. Also, problems within traditional university models could easily transfer to the university/bootcamp partnerships. On the other hand, others believe that enhancing policy around financial aid will help lower-income prospective students attend. There are several sentiments of coding bootcamps being accessible only for the rich.

== Coding businesses ==
Some businesses such as Code Ninjas and Northcoders work with children in bootcamps and other coding programs in order to progress them through different levels and areas of the field of programming.

== List of coding bootcamps ==
- 42 (school)
- AAPC (healthcare)
- Ada Developers Academy
- Andela
- Bloom Institute of Technology
- Code First Girls
- Code Ninjas
- The Data Incubator
- Dev Bootcamp
- DevMountain
- Flatiron School
- FreeCodeCamp
- Fullstack Academy
- General Assembly (school)
- Hack Reactor
- Kode With Klossy
- Lighthouse Labs
- Makers Academy
- Thinkful
- Trilogy Education Services
- TrueCoders
- Turing College

== See also ==
- Career and Technical Education
- Competitive programming
- Codewars
- Datathon
- Game jam
- Hackathon
- List of educational software
- List of online educational resources
- List of free and open-source software packages
- List of MOOC providers
- List of online integrated development environments
- Upskilling
