= Michael Riedel (artist) =

- Born: July 12, 1972 (age 54); Rüsselsheim, West Germany
- Known for: Contemporary art

Michael Riedel (born July 12, 1972) is a contemporary artist who lives and works in Frankfurt. His work operates at the interface between applied graphics and free art. Since 2017, he has been professor of painting/graphics at the Hochschule für Grafik und Buchkunst in Leipzig.

== Work ==
Riedel studied at the Kunstakademie Düsseldorf, the École nationale supérieure des beaux-arts de Paris and the Städelschule in Frankfurt am Main from 1994 to 2000. There he became a master student of Hermann Nitsch. The "S." that Riedel temporarily included in his name originated from his time at the Städelschule. He first used the name "Michael S. Riedel" - at that time in lower case throughout - as an inscription on a paper bag that he put over his head in 1997 at the end of a lecture he had given at the Städelschule. The letter "S." was fictitious. He sold it to a friend ten years later. She has carried it in her name ever since.

His idea of a functioning work of art in the form of a drawing that draws itself emerged during his studies. Starting with a signature without a work (signet), which marks the non-existent works as a blank space, the work complex Signetische Zeichnung (1994-1995) emerges with over one thousand drawings in the form of 61 sheets and 36 books. "The self-perpetuating work in the sense of the concept of autopoiesis" as coined by Niklas Luhmann, is shown for the first time by the Museum für angewandte Kunst Frankfurt in the exhibition Michael Riedel - Grafik als Ereignis (2018).

Following his studies, he initiates the art space Oskar-von-Miller Strasse 16 (2000) in Frankfurt am Main together with Dennis Loesch in a vacant residential building "It's about a space full of possibilities, but none of them is as interesting as the space itself, which contains the possibilities". Until the building was demolished (2006), numerous events took place there that were simply repetitions of other events and subverted the usual art establishment with an "art of the incident". "Recording - labelling - playing" becomes the basic principle of artistic production, the culmination of which is the reconstruction of the art space itself in the exhibition Kontext - Form - Troja (Wiener Secession, 2003). The publication Oskar-a novel (2003) appears, with the transcript of a 2-day anecdotal conference and numerous illustrations of the events held, such as Clubbed Clubs and Filmed Films, etc. Excerpts translated into English are published by Riedel and Loesch as the False Frieze Art Fair Catalogue (2004) to accompany their stand at the art fair in London.

In 2004, the exhibition NOSNHO.-....... [ROBERT-JOHNSON] together wir the gallerist Michael Neff, the Frankfurt nightclub Robert Johnson was imitated. The entire interior, however, was hung from the ceiling in reverse from bottom to top, and the dance music was played backwards. With numerous situational duplications, Riedel presents the reality found in each case as also-possible. He himself calls this the "zero point of creativity". Nicolas Bourriaud has described this trend from a curatorial perspective in relation to information culture in Postproduction: Culture as Screenplay. How Art Reprogramms the World (2002). He sees in artistic procedures of rearranging and reprogramming the potential of a resistance against market-shaped culture. Riedel's claim to autonomy for art, however, goes beyond this. He allows a kind of "parallel world to emerge from echoes, afterimages and replicas", the reception of which he incorporates into his graphic work, exposing it to further receptions and thus making the "seemingly endless quantity of printed matter" his actual subject. Andreas Beyer calls Riedel, comparable to his Pauszeichnungen, a "pause" in the art system on the occasion of the exhibition CV(Curriculum Vitae) at the Kunsthalle Zurich in 2017.

In 2004, Riedel founded the Freitagsküche at Oskar-von-Miller-Straße, a culinary and social meeting point, a restaurant where artists cooked for visitors and which was only open one evening a week. After the demolition of the art space, Riedel and Loesch temporarily moved their artistic activities as well as the Freitagsküche to Berlin-Mitte, at Weydinger Strasse 20. in 2010 Riedel returned to Frankfurt, where the Freitagsküche still exists today. He designed the space for the Freitagsküche's one-year guest performance at the Museum für Moderne Kunst Frankfurt in 2015.

Riedel's first exhibition in New York at David Zwirner is titled Neo (2005) and refers to the Neo Rauch exhibition previously shown at the same venue. Programmatically, he uses the information material with which the gallery had previously communicated Rauch's paintings, to re-stage it. The original foreword of the Neo Rauch catalogue Painters, Germans and other Renegades later becomes the catalogue text And Germans other Painters, Renegades, sorted alphabetically by Riedel.

In 2009, Riedel responded with a parallel project to the exhibition Meister von Flémalle and Rogier van der Weyden, which took place at the Städel in Frankfurt in 2009. "The focus of his interest here is less on the artworks themselves than on the further processing of the visual material of the exhibits. Specifically, the mediation media - poster, flyer, postcards, catalogue of the exhibition - are used by Riedel to produce four variations (CMYK) of each of the printed products."

He produces variations of logos from well-known institutions. The Tate Modern in London shows his large-scale canvases Vier Vorschläge zur Veränderung von Modern im Logo von The Modern Institute (2008). In addition, alternative spellings such as Vier Vorschläge zur Veränderung von Jo in Johann König and Vier Vorschläge zur Veränderung von David Zwirner in the gallery logo are created. On the occasion of the 70th anniversary of the Frankfurter Allgemeine Zeitung, the FAZ edition Vier Vorschläge zur Veränderung von Allg[emein] on the "Crisis of the General" is being created in 2019.

A focal point of Riedel's work is the design of books, catalogues, brochures, posters and invitations. His artistic practice is accompanied by immense text production. In the years 1997-2007 alone, sound recordings totaling 86,000 minutes were made. Geschriebene und nicht geschriebene Texte [Aufnahmen] with which he captures linguistic moments of the art world, transcribes them and transforms them into writing. From the audio cassettes he initially used (90 min.), to the minidisc recorder (320 min.) and the digital recorders (8,000 minutes and more), one can see the explosion of material in stored data. Added to this is the use of voice recognition programs, which makes writing autonomous. Riedel does not regard the texts obtained in this way as literature, but first as material to overwrite existing literature and subsequently as graphic material for the production of his significant pictorial surfaces (Muster des Kunstsystems).

His paintings include the „Poster und PowerPoint Paintings" created since 2010, in which he uses, among other things, screenshots of cross-fades generated by the presentation program Microsoft PowerPoint.

Riedel makes "a kind of appropriation art" by going back to things that already exist, appropriating them, repeating them and creating a second image of them in the process. Insofar as Riedel works with text in his works, it serves as a "graphic element". For example, the reproduction of the source texts of websites are "not dummy texts", but "material that has a documentary value", with which Riedel, as he himself says, "works in a painterly way". Riedel's work is not just about text, it is also about the use of text.

The mutual irritation between the work and the description of the work is the subject of his major museum exhibitions Kunste zur Text statt Texte zur Kunst (Schirn Kunsthalle, 2012), Dual Air [Dürer] (Palais de Tokyo, Paris, 2014), CV (Kunsthalle Zürich, 2017) and Grafik als Ereignis (Museum Angewandte Kunst Frankfurt, 2018). In collaboration with composer Oliver Augst, he is creating an eight-hour soundtrack for the exhibition ˈzɛlpstbəˈʃʁaɪ̯bʊŋ (Museum der Bildenden Künste Leipzig, 2019), which acoustically reproduces the patterns of the pictorial surfaces.

He designed the cover for the album Top of the Pops (2013) for the band Art Brut. He himself is featured on the cover of Wallpaper magazine with his publication Scheissen und Brunzen (2014). Dom Perignon hires him for their Vintage Limited Edition (2016).

End of 2017, he parted ways with his galerist David Zwirner. In 2018, he spoke about the separation from the gallery in an interview with the art magazine Monopol, explaining: "We worked together for 14 years, and during that time I witnessed how the business developed and became bigger and bigger. It is in the logic of the matter that the self-interest in the business increases the bigger the business becomes, and at a certain point it is only concerned with itself. I don't want to say that the cooperation was bad. But it reached a point for me where it was no longer satisfying." In collaboration with the Deutsche Bundesbank, he produced a combined total of approximately 45 million Riedels on original Euro note paper, as well as associated ATMs for automated art trading. The bank's art department was also involved in the production of the Riedels.

Together with the architects Kühn Malvezzi, he is developing the 4000 m² Schriftbild Museum (2013-2017) for the extension of the Moderne Galerie in Saarbrücken. The graphic of the plaza opening up on the building's facade is the political debate of the Saarland state parliament, which discussed the realisation of the previously failed building project in its session. As a permanent installation, there is also a ceiling painting in the new building of Cornell Tech University in New York by Thom Mayne / Morphosis with 44 associated table tops (2017-2018), as well as the 28 movable wall panels with the alphabetically sorted reproduction of the Interpretation of Dreams (2016) in the conference room of the Sigmund Freud Institute in Frankfurt am Main. The installation is a permanent installation in the new building of Cornell Tech University in New York by Thom Mayne / Morphosis.

== Exhibitions ==
Riedel's work has been the subject of solo exhibitions at Galerie Michel Rein, Paris (2018, 2015, 2012, 2010) and Brussels (2013), David Zwirner, New York (2005, 2008, 2011, 2013, 2016) and London (2014), Bischoff Projects, Frankfurt (2011, 2016), Fotomuseum Winterthur, Switzerland (2016), Goethe-Institut, Amsterdam (2014), BWA SOKÓL Gallery, Nowy Sacz, Poland (2013), Gabriele Senn Galerie, Vienna (2011, 2013, 2014), Zoo galerie, Nantes, France (2011), Portikus, Frankfurt (2011), Galerie Michel Rein, Paris (2010), Kunstverein, Hamburg, Germany (2010), Städel Museum, Frankfurt, Germany (2009), Kunstraum Innsbruck, Innsbruck, Austria (2007), Portikus, Frankfurt, Germany (2002) as well as various installations at Oskar-von-Miller Strasse 16 in Frankfurt and Berlin.

His work has also been shown in group exhibitions at numerous venues throughout Europe and the United States, including the Fondation d'enterprise Ricard, Paris (2016, 2010), Kunsthaus, Hamburg (2016), Irish Museum of Modern Art, Dublin (2013), Sprengel Museum Hannover, Kunstverein Hannover (2012), Swiss Institute, New York (2011), Tate Modern, London, England (2009), Kunstverein Oldenburg, Oldenburg, Germany (2008), The Modern Institute, Glasgow, Scotland (2008), Städel Museum, Frankfurt, Germany (2008), the Lyon Biennial of Contemporary Art, Lyon, France (2007), Artists Space, New York (2007), Kunsthalle Bern, Bern, Switzerland (2006), Museum der Moderne, Salzburg, Austria (2005), the Moscow Biennial at the Lenin Museum, Moscow, Russia (2005), the Vienna Museum, Vienna, Austria (2004), and the Vienna Secession, Vienna, Austria (2003).

== Publications ==
- Michael Riedel, Abstract, Volume 1 (2oo4–2o11), Leipzig 2022, ISBN 978-3-95905-614-4.
- Ohne Titel (Museum), Saarlandmuseum, Saarbrücken 2019, ISBN 978-3-932036-97-2.
- Signetische Zeichnung 1994–1995 / Grafik als Ereignis, König, Köln 2019, ISBN 978-3-88270-125-8.
- CV, König, Köln 2017, ISBN 978-3-96098-189-3.
- Fuchs, Koenig, Köln 2017, ISBN 978-3-96098-109-1.
- Muster des Kunstsystems [Wallpapers], Distanz Verlag, Berlin 2017, ISBN 978-3-95476-190-6.
- Besuchte und nicht besuchte Ausstellungen [Einladungen]. Koenig Books, Köln 2016, ISBN 978-3-86335-868-6.
- Poster–Painting–Presentation. David Zwirner Books, New York 2016, ISBN 978-1-941701-32-4.
- Dual Air [Dürer] / Jacques Comité [Giacometti]. Koenig Books, London 2015, ISBN 978-3-86335-700-9.
- Oskar-a novel. Zwirner, New York 2014, ISBN 978-0-9899809-5-1.
- Max Hollein, Matthias Ulrich (Hrsg.): Kunste zur Text. Walther König, Köln 2012, ISBN 978-3-86335-207-3 (Katalog zur gleichnamigen Retrospektive in der Schirn Kunsthalle Frankfurt).
- Perlstein. König, Köln 2011, ISBN 978-3-86560-975-5.
- Kunste zur Text. König, Köln 2012, ISBN 978-3-86335-207-3.
- Meckert. König, Köln 2009, ISBN 978-3-86560-691-4.
- Gedruckte und nicht gedruckte Poster. König, Köln 2008, ISBN 978-3-86560-381-4.
- Saab 95. Monobuch Verlag, Rüsselsheim 2007, ISBN 978-3-938672-02-0.
- Tirala. Herausgegeben von der Galerie Senn. Schlebrügge, Wien, 2006, ISBN 3-85160-086-X.
- Neo. Revolver Verlag, Frankfurt am Main 2005, ISBN 3-86588-210-2.
- Johnson–Robert. Revolver Verlag, Frankfurt am Main, 2004, ISBN 3-937577-60-2.
- Scheissen und Brunzen. Revolver Verlag, Frankfurt am Main, 2000/2004, ISBN 3-937577-34-3.
- False Frieze Art Fair Catalogue. Revolver Verlag, Frankfurt am Main, 2004, ISBN 3-86588-053-3.
- Oskar–a novel. Silverbridge, Paris 2003.

== Sources ==
[1] Matthias Wagner K., Eva Linhart (Hrsg.): Michael Riedel, Signetische Zeichnung 1994–1995. 2018, ISBN 978-3-88270-125-8

[2] Fabian Famulok: 8 Kunst & Publikation. In: Schirn-Mag. 15. August 2012. (26. August 2012)

[3] Matthias Wagner K, Eva Linhart, Museum Angewandte Kunst Frankfurt am Main: Michael Riedel Grafik als Ereignis, signetische Zeichnung, 1994–1995 = Michael Riedel : graphic art as event, the signetic drawing 199–1995. Köln 2018, ISBN 978-3-88270-125-8.

[4] Michael S. Riedel, Dennis Loesch, Alina Grumiller, Hank Schmidt in der Beek, Niklas Schechinger: Oskar-von-Miller Strasse 16. Newly translated, revised, and expanded edition Auflage. New York, New York 2014, ISBN 0-9899809-5-2

[5] Matthias Wagner K, Eva Linhart, Museum Angewandte Kunst Frankfurt am Main: Michael Riedel Grafik als Ereignis, signetische Zeichnung, 1994–1995 = Michael Riedel : graphic art as event, the signetic drawing 199–1995. Köln 2018, ISBN 978-3-88270-125-8

[6] OPENINGS: MICHAEL S. RIEDEL. (2. März 2021)

[7] Andreas Beyer: Es rappelt im Karton. Hrsg.: Frankfurter Allgemeine Zeitung. Frankfurt am Main 8. Juni 2017.

[8] Freitagsküche. Website der heutigen Freitagsküche. (24. August 2012)

[9] Sarah Elsing: Freitagsküche Frankfurt: Auch sonst ist alles wie in Berlin. In: Die Zeit. 22. Dezember 2010. (24. August 2012)

[10] Grit Weber: Die Freitagsküche ist zurück. In: Journal Frankfurt. 2. September 2011. (24. August 2012)

[11] Ein Treffpunkt für Kunst und Genuss. 23. Mai 2015. (2. März 2021)

[12] Michael S. Riedel, Gallery David Zwirner, NY Exhibition NEO by Michael S. Riedel New York: Michael S. Riedel – NEO anlässlich der Ausstellung NEO von Michael S. Riedel (22.11. −23. Dezember 2005, Galerie David Zwirner, New York). Frankfurt am Main 2006, ISBN 978-3-86588-210-3

[13] Michael Riedel: Vier Vorschläge zur Veränderung. Städel-Museum. 7.–8. März 2009. (30. August 2012)

[14] Stutter. (2. März 2021)

[15] Michael Riedel – Vier Vorschläge zur Veränderung von Allg(emein) in Frankfurter Allgemeine, 2019. (2. März 2021)

[16] Michael S. Riedel, Dennis Loesch, Alina Grumiller, Hank Schmidt in der Beek, Niklas Schechinger: Oskar-von-Miller Strasse 16. Newly translated, revised, and expanded edition Auflage. New York, New York 2014, ISBN 0-9899809-5-2, S. 487 ff.

[17] Distanz Verlag, DISTANZ Verlag GmbH: Michael Riedel – Muster des Kunstsystems (wallpapers). [1. Auflage]. Berlin 2017, ISBN 978-3-95476-190-6

[18] Annika Sellmann: Form Sprechen – Sprache formen. In: Schirn-Mag. 15. August 2012. (26. August 2012)

[19] Matthias Ulrich. In: Michael Riedel: Kunste zur Text. Kurzfilm zur Ausstellung. Schirn Kunsthalle. 4. Juli 2012. (26. August 2012) (2.03–3.05 Minutes).

[20] Matthias Ulrich. In: Michael Riedel: Kunste zur Text. Kurzfilm zur Ausstellung. Schirn Kunsthalle. 4. Juli 2012. (26. August 2012) (1.16–1.35 Minutes).

[21] Michael Riedel. In: Michael Riedel: Kunste zur Text. Kurzfilm zur Ausstellung. Schirn Kunsthalle. 4. Juli 2012. (26. August 2012) (0.09–0.29 Minutes).

[22] MICHAEL RIEDEL. 15. Juni 2012. (2. März 2021)

[23] Michael Riedel. 26. Mai 2016. (2. März 2021)

[24] Michael Riedel | Kunsthalle Zürich. (2. März 2021)

[25] Michael Riedel. Grafik als Ereignis / Museum Angewandt Kunst. (2. März 2021)

[26] Museum der bildenden Künste Leipzig: Michael Riedel.(2. März 2021)

[27] Alan D. Welding: Art Brut Streams Full ‘Top Of The Pops’ Best Of Compilation On Spinner. In: PITTSBURGH MUSIC MAGAZINE. 17. April 2013. (2. März 2021)

[28] Wallpaper* Magazine: Michael Riedel gives menswear a graphic slant. 12. Februar 2014. (2. März 2021)

[29] Dom Pérignon: Dom Pérignonund Michael Riedel. 10. Oktober 2017. (2. März 2021)

[30] Michael Riedel im Interview mit Sarah Alberti: "Viele Galerien sind gefangen in ihrer Seriosität" | Monopol. 11. September 2018. (17. November 2020)

[31] Michael Riedel | Riedels. (2. März 2021)

[32] Michael Riedel – Geldmacher. (2. März 2021)

[33] BauNetz: Glücksfall statt Katastrophe – Erweiterung Moderne Galerie in Saarbrücken von Kuehn Malvezzi. 22. November 2017. (2. März 2021)

[34] Hilarie M. Sheets: At Cornell Tech, Art Engineered for the Imagination (Published 2017). In: The New York Times. 13. September 2017, ISSN 0362-4331 (nytimes.com, 2. März 2021)

[35] Stefan Toepfer, Frankfurt: Sigmund-Freud-Institut: Neues Zentrum der Psychoanalyse in Frankfurt. In: FAZ.NET. ISSN 0174-4909 (faz.net, 2. März 2021)
