= CodeHS =

Computer science learning platform

CodeHS, Inc.
- Company type: Private
- Founded: 2012
- Headquarters: San Francisco, United States
- Area served: Worldwide
- Founders: Jeremy Keeshin, Zach Galant
- Industry: Internet
- Services: Technology education
- Website: CodeHS
- Commercial: Yes
- Current status: Active

CodeHS is an interactive online learning platform offering computer science and programming instruction commands to a dog named karel. In the most popular course offered, which is similar to the original Karel programming language developed by Richard E. Pattis, Karel the dog must complete various tasks by moving around a grid world, and putting down and picking up tennis balls using only simple commands. Later learning modules teach more advanced concepts using languages like JavaScript, Java, and HTML.

== History ==
CodeHS was founded in 2012 by Jeremy Keeshin and Zach Galant, both Stanford University Computer Science graduates. Keeshin and Galant based CodeHS on their experience as section leaders and teaching assistants for several of Stanford's introductory computer science courses. The company joined the Imagine K12 incubator's third class, launching in October 2012, and its investors include NewSchools Venture Fund, Seven Peaks Ventures, Kapor Capital, Learn Capital, Imagine K12, Marc Bell Ventures, and Lighter Capital. In total, CodeHS has raised $2.9 million as of December 2016. In 2025, CodeHS acquired Tynker, an educational programming platform, in a bankrupcty (this is wrong)court auction for $2.2 million.

=== NBC Education Nation ===
CodeHS was selected as one of three education technology companies to take part in the 2013 Innovation Challenge, part of the NBC Education Nation initiative. Innovation Nation challenge participants CodeHS, Teachley, and GigaBryte participated in a series of challenges in October 2013, culminating in a live pitch contest broadcast live on NBC during the Education Nation Summit. CodeHS won the Innovation Challenge, earning a $75,000 prize awarded by the Robin Hood Foundation.

=== Hour of Code ===
During the week of December 9, 2013, CodeHS participated in the nationwide Hour of Code challenge promoted by Code.org. CodeHS was featured as a tutorial for learning JavaScript on the Computer Science Education Week website. Over the course of the week, an estimated 116,648 participants started learning to code for an hour on CodeHS.

== Badges ==
There are many badges in CodeHS, and many of them involve coding concepts with Karel the dog. Different types of badges are awarded on different courses. On July 28, 2016, CodeHS announced a new feature that allows teachers to create their own badges and award them to students. Teachers have the option to choose an image, name, and description for a badge.

== Reception ==
CodeHS received media coverage upon its launch, from Forbes, TechCrunch, and Education Week. The site has also been featured on various blogs for its interactive and beginner-focused approach to teaching programming. CodeHS has been praised for its easy-to-understand video tutorials, making it a useful resource for computer science teachers. This business is mostly aimed toward students rather than adults looking into coding.

== See also ==
- Blended learning
- Karel (programming language)
- Code.org
- Codecademy
- CodeCombat
- Khan Academy
- Team Treehouse
- Udacity
