= Code.org =

American non-profit organization

- Former logo used, primary, 2013–2025, secondary, 2025-present
- Formation: January 2013; 13 years ago
- Founders: Hadi Partovi and Ali Partovi
- Type: 501(c)(3) organization
- Tax ID no.: 46-0858543
- Purpose: Computer science education
- Headquarters: Seattle, Washington
- CEO: Hadi Partovi
- Website: code.org

Code.org, branded as CodeAI since June 2026, is a non-profit organization and educational website founded by Hadi and Ali Partovi, aimed at K–12 students who specialize in computer science. The website includes coding lessons and other resources. The initiative also targets schools in the United States in an attempt to encourage them to include more computer science classes in the curriculum. In 2013, they launched the Hour of Code across the United States to promote computer science during Computer Science Education Week.

Code.org rebranded to CodeAI in June 2026, pivoting towards teaching the use of artificial intelligence in code curricula aside computer programming.

== History ==
Code.org was launched in January 2013 by Iranian-American twin brothers Hadi Partovi and Ali Partovi, as a non-profit focused on making computer programming more accessible. The initial focus was on creating a database of all computer science classrooms in the United States. At the time, Hadi Partovi stated that about ninety percent of US schools do not teach programming, despite it now being a "foundational field". The idea for the organization came from Hadi, who states that he thought of it on the day of Steve Jobs's death in 2011 while mulling over his own potential legacy. After this, Hadi began working full-time in attempt to further grow the platform and organization.

In late February 2013, a month after launch, they released a video featuring Mark Zuckerberg, Bill Gates, Jack Dorsey, and other programmers and entrepreneurs on the importance of learning how to code. Two weeks after the launch, TechCrunch reported that the video had gone viral and received a lot of positive attention. Partovi raised about $10 million for Code.org from various tech companies and tech company founders. In 2014, Code.org posted a one-hour tutorial to build and customize a Flappy Bird video game using the site's block visual programming language. Code.org has also created coding programs revolving around characters from the Disney film Frozen, in addition to Angry Birds, and Plants vs. Zombies. In December 2014, Code.org held a successful Indiegogo crowdfunding campaign that raised over $5 million to help educate school children. Overall, about 100 million students have been reached by Code.org efforts. On November 16, 2015, Microsoft announced a partnership with Code.org to launch Minecraft as a tutorial to teach kids how to code.

In February 2016, Code.org won the award for "Biggest Social Impact" at the Annual Crunchies Awards. In December 2016, Code.org entered NASDAQ. In March 2017, Code.org began extending its work to the region of Rajasthan, India.

On June 2, 2026, Code.org rebranded as CodeAI. In a statement, the organization said, "84% of US students report using AI, but only 16% of high school leaders say all their students are learning about AI in school. That gap is the reason Code.org is becoming CodeAI today."

== Hour of Code ==
During Computer Science Education Week from December 9 to December 15, 2013, Code.org launched the "Hour of Code Challenge" on its website to teach computer science to school students, enticing them to complete short programming tutorials. The Hour of Code involved getting people to write short snippets of code to achieve pre-specified goals using Blockly, a visual programming language. The initiative had been announced about two months in advance and at the time of launch, the initiative was supported by then United States President Barack Obama as well as executives from technology companies such as Microsoft and Apple Inc. It was also supported by educational online learning platforms such as Khan Academy. About 20 million people participated. The Hour of Code also offered participation gifts to some of the schools involved, such as a set of fifty laptops or a conference call with one tech "luminary" like Bill Gates or Jack Dorsey. The crowdfunding effort for Hour of Code received the highest amount of funding ever raised on Indiegogo. By October 2014, about forty million students had taken the Hour of Code class, and a second Hour of Code was held in December 2014. That year, locations for Hour of Code lessons included Apple retail stores. In December 2016, Canadian Prime Minister Justin Trudeau helped launch the international Hour of Code campaign for 2016. In December 2017, Code.org announced that Hour of Code had reached over 500 million hours served.

== Curriculum efforts ==
The first step in the organization's efforts as regards the curriculum of schools was to work with US school districts to add computer programming as a class. Most US schools did not have a course code for computer sciences, in order for schools to be able to offer coding as a class. After this, the next step was to create free online teaching and learning materials for schools to use if instituting computer science classes. By 2014, Code.org had launched computer courses in thirty US school districts to reach about 5% of all the students in US public schools (about two million students), and by 2015, Code.org had trained about 15,000 teachers to teach computer sciences, able to reach about 600,000 new students previously unable to learn computer coding, with large percentages of those being either female or minorities. To date, Code.org has prepared over 72,000 educators to teach computer science.

That year Code.org was partnered with about seventy of the largest US school districts (including each of the seven largest), representing several million students. The company also partnered with other computer class businesses and private entities to provide additional computer learning materials and opportunities. As of 2015, six million students had been enrolled in Code.org curriculum classes. That year, Code.org partnered with College Board, in order to develop a slate of advanced placement computer classes. The main platform used in Code.org instruction is Code Studio which according to TechCrunch, "teaches the underlying concepts in programming through the manipulation of blocks of logic that when stacked together in a particular order, move a character around a scene or draw a shape."

In 2018, Code.org celebrated record participation by girls and underrepresented minorities in AP computer science classrooms, driven in large part by students in the Code.org CS Principles classrooms.

== Legislative efforts ==
One of the main lobbying efforts of Code.org in state legislatures is to ensure that computer classes are not registered as foreign language classes, but as science classes, in order to ensure that more than coding is taught in computer courses. Code.org also focuses specifically on female and minority students, as the organization believes these are the students most at risk of not receiving computer science education before high school or college.

== Goals ==
According to its website, Code.org has the following goals:

- Bringing Computer Science classes to every K–12 school in the United States, especially in urban and rural neighborhoods.
- Demonstrating the successful use of online curriculum in public school classrooms
- Changing policies in all 50 states to categorize C.S. as part of the math/science "core" curriculum
- Harnessing the collective power of the tech community to celebrate and grow C.S. education worldwide
- Increasing the representation of women and students of color in the field of Computer Science.
- Increasing their global outreach by making their courses available in more than 45 languages that are used in over 180 countries.

== Reception ==
Writing for San Jose Mercury News, Mike Cassidy praised Code.org and the Hour of Code, writing: "A publicity stunt is what we need." John Dvorak was critical of the Hour of Code in an article for PC Magazine. Dvorak wrote: "I see it as a ploy to sell more computers in schools."

Code.org's work has been recognized by Michael Halvorson as a significant contributor to the learn to program movement, a broad-based computer literacy agenda that began in the 1980s and has been amplified by the Internet and an array of commercial and educational practices.

== See also ==
- Codecademy
- CodeCombat
- CodeHS
- Coursera
- edX
- Khan Academy
- LinkedIn Learning
- Raspberry Pi
- Scratch (programming language)
- Udacity
- Treehouse (company)
- Tynker
- W3Schools
