= Tamron Hall =

American journalist, talk show host (born 1970)

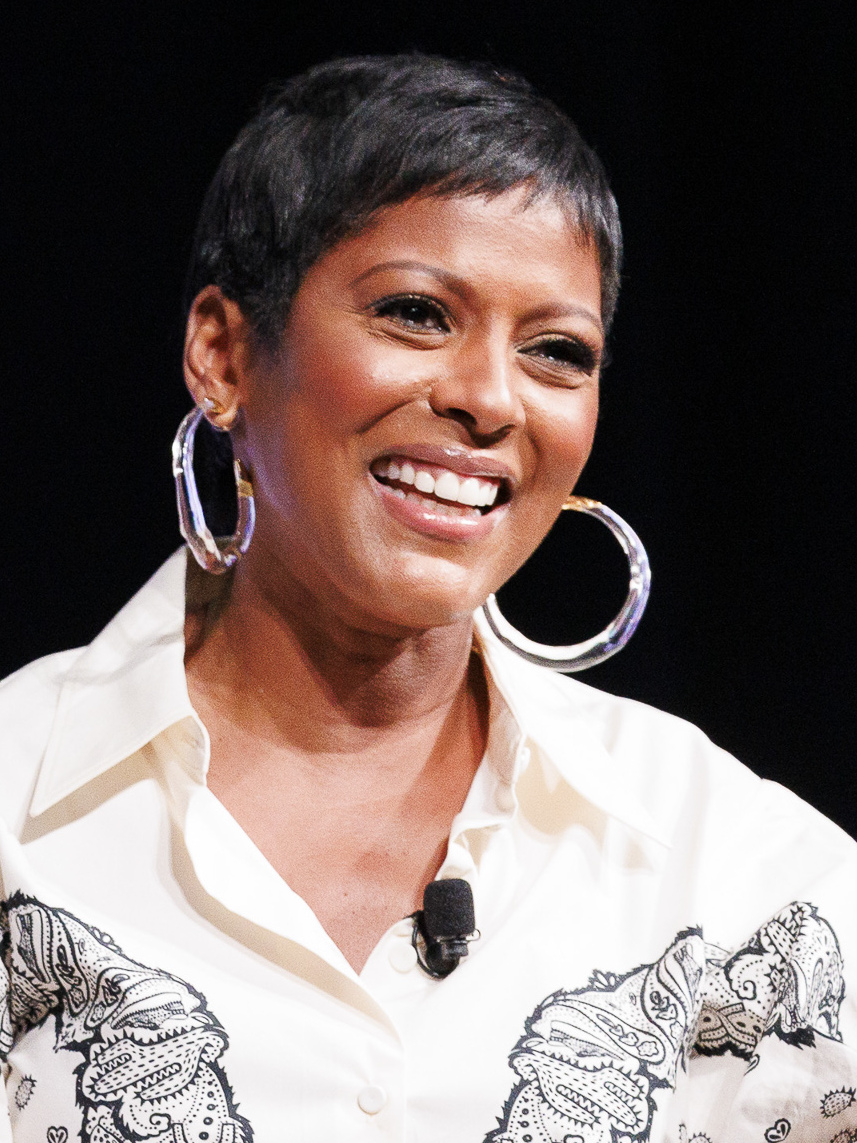
- Hall in 2024
- Born: September 16, 1970 (age 56); Luling, Texas, U.S.
- Education: Temple University (BA)
- Occupations: Television journalist; talk show host; author
- Years active: 1992–present
- Notable credits: KBTX (1992–1994); KTVT (1994–1997); WFLD (1997–2007); MSNBC (2007–2017); Today's Take (2014–2017); Tamron Hall (2019–present)
- Spouse: Steven Greener (m. 2019)
- Children: 1

Tamron Hall (born September 16, 1970) is an American broadcast journalist, television talk show host and author. In September 2019, Hall debuted her self-titled syndicated daytime talk show, which has earned her two Daytime Emmy Awards. Hall was formerly a national news correspondent for NBC News, daytime anchor for MSNBC, host of the program MSNBC Live with Tamron Hall, and a co-host of Today's Take, the third hour of Today. She hosts Deadline: Crime on Investigation Discovery channel. In summer 2016, Investigation Discovery premiered the TV special Guns on Campus: Tamron Hall Investigates, which commemorated the 50th anniversary of the tower shooting at the University of Texas at Austin.

== Early life and education ==
Hall was raised in Luling, Texas. Her mother was an educator and her father had a military career, serving in the US Army for three decades. She received her Bachelor of Arts in Broadcast Journalism from Temple University in 1992, after which she moved to the Dallas-Fort Worth area to begin her broadcasting career.

== Career ==
Hall first worked at KBTX-TV in Bryan, Texas, as a general assignment reporter, then moved to KTVT in Fort Worth, Texas, in 1994, where she spent four more years as a general assignment reporter.

From 1997 to 2007, she worked for WFLD in Chicago, Illinois. She held several positions, including general assignment reporter, consumer reporter, and host of a three-hour program, Fox News in the Morning. Hall frequently reported on issues related to Chicago politics, and she covered many "breaking news" stories, including one of the most devastating Amtrak accidents in Illinois.

In July 2007, Hall joined the national news network MSNBC and NBC News. She also landed a one-on-one interview with Barack Obama before he announced his run for US President in 2008.

At MSNBC, Hall served as a general reporter and fill-in anchor, first achieving prominence as a substitute anchor for Keith Olbermann on Countdown with Keith Olbermann. Hall then joined David Shuster as co-host of a two-hour program, The Big Picture, which premiered June 1, 2009, and concluded January 29, 2010. Hall anchored as a substitute for Natalie Morales, and also anchored on the weekends.

=== NewsNation with Tamron Hall ===
In 2010, hosted NewsNation with Tamron Hall, which included high-profile interviews and coverage of US, global and entertainment news. Airing weekday afternoons, the show covered important American events, including a live television broadcast from Ground Zero in New York City after the death of Osama Bin Laden, the final space shuttle launch in 2011, and Hurricane Isaac in 2012. Hall also encouraged viewers to express their opinions via social media on prominent, controversial news stories.

=== Deadline: Crime with Tamron Hall ===
In July 2013, it was announced that Hall would host Deadline: Crime With Tamron Hall on Investigation Discovery. The weekly newsmagazine series features two crime occurrences per one-hour episode, and debuted on September 1, 2013. In each episode, Hall and her investigative team uncover details on why and how things happened within each case, obtaining information from as many reputable sources as possible. The series ran for six seasons, 2013 to 2019. Hall dedicates the series to her older sister, whose death was ruled a homicide in 2004 and remains unsolved.

=== The Today Show ===
On February 24, 2014, Hall premiered as co-anchor of Today's Take (The Today Show's third hour with Natalie Morales, Al Roker and Willie Geist), becoming the first African American woman to co-anchor Today. On the day she signed the deal, she wore the jacket of American singer and civil rights activist Lena Horne, which she bought from Horne's estate sale. Horne remains a primary inspiration to Hall.

In February 2017, after the network gave her Today co-hosting slot to Megyn Kelly, Hall opted out of her contract and decided to leave NBC rather than take a lesser role.

On February 1, 2017, with Hall's contract expiring within the month, NBC News and Hall released a joint statement confirming Hall's decision to depart from both NBC and MSNBC.

=== Tamron Hall (talk show) ===
In July 2017, it was announced that Hall and Harvey Weinstein were producing a daytime talk show that would be hosted and executive produced by Hall. However, Hall's partnership experienced a setback when the Weinstein sexual misconduct scandal broke.

On August 8, 2018, Hall entered a new agreement with Disney–ABC Domestic Television to executive produce and host a syndicated daytime talk show. The show was picked up by ABC Owned Television Stations in late September 2018. In December 2018, Hearst Television picked up the show for stations in 24 markets, and on January 22, 2019, ABC Entertainment named Bill Geddie as executive producer for the show along with Hall.

On September 9, 2019, Tamron debuted her self-titled syndicated daytime talk show. With more than 85% US coverage that includes 47 of the top 50 markets, on March 4, 2019, it was announced that Tamron Hall would debut on September 9, 2019.

In June 2020, Tamron Hall was honored with three Daytime Emmy nominations by the National Academy of Television Arts and Sciences, with Hall's hosting win marking the first time since the award's inception in 2015 that a freshman host was the recipient of that honor. Hall also received an NAACP Image Awards nomination for Outstanding Talk Series for Tamron Hall in its freshman season and in September 2020, Hall accepted the Gracie Award for Outstanding Talk Show Host and dedicated the honor to Breonna Taylor. In 2022, Hall won her second Emmy as Informative Talk Show Host.

On November 8, 2021, ABC announced that the show has been renewed for the fourth and fifth seasons, through 2024. On April 15, 2024, the series was renewed for the sixth season. In February 2025, Disney-ABC renewed the show for its seventh season.

=== Someone They Knew... with Tamron Hall ===
In November 2021, CourtTV announced that Hall would be the host of the true crime series, Someone They Knew... with Tamron Hall. The show debuted on January 9, 2022. In June 2022, the show was renewed for a second season, which premiered in February 2023.

=== Other appearances ===
Hall was featured on a 2014 episode of Running Wild with Bear Grylls where she and Bear Grylls hiked for two days in the Pink Cliffs of southwestern Utah. They rappelled down several cliffs, cooked a squirrel over a fire, and hiked over rugged terrain. She made a guest appearance as herself on General Hospital on September 13, 2019. Hall served as the 'Tell All' reunion host on seasons 6 through 9 of Sister Wives.

=== Author ===
Hall's debut novel, As the Wicked Watch, was first published October 26, 2021, with a 100,000 copy first printing. It is the first book in her Jordan Manning mystery series. On March 12, 2024, Hall's second novel in the series, Watch Where They Hide was released.

== Accolades ==
Hall's media awards and recognition include:

- An Emmy nomination for her consumer report segment, "The Bottom Line," which first aired in 1999.
- 2010: Won the Lew Klein Alumni in the Media award from Temple University and is an Alumni Hall of Fame Honoree.
- October 2010: Served as reporter of the NBC News segment "The Inauguration of Barack Obama," which was nominated for an Emmy.
- 2011: Emmy nomination for a segment called "Education Nation: Teacher Town Hall".
- 2016: Won an Edward R. Murrow Award for her report on domestic abuse.
- 2020: NAACP Image Awards nomination for Outstanding Talk Series for her self-titled talk show.
- 2020: Won a Daytime Emmy Award for Outstanding Informative Talk Show Host for her self-titled talk show.
- 2020: Gracie Awards Honoree for Outstanding Talk Show Host-Entertainment presented by the Alliance for Women in Media Foundation.
- 2021: NAACP Image Awards nomination for Outstanding Talk Series for Tamron Hall.
- 2022: Won a NATPE Iris Award for Award for Excellence, Television Performer
- 2022: Won a Daytime Emmy Award for Outstanding Informative Talk Show Host for her self-titled talk show.
- 2024: NAACP Image Awards nomination for Outstanding Host in a Talk or News / Information for her self-titled talk show.

Hall has also been featured in several major news publications, including Ebony, Forbes, People, and The Huffington Post.

Hall was the 2017 Honorary Muse in the Krewe of Muses parade during Mardi Gras in New Orleans.

== Anti-domestic violence campaign ==
In 2004, Hall's sister Renate was murdered following bouts of domestic violence. Although police officers initially informed Hall's family of their certainty regarding her attacker's identity, that person was not charged and the case remains unsolved. During an interview at the Television Critics Association in January 2014, Hall described receiving the phone call that her sister had been found dead, noting that, in hindsight, there had been many signs of domestic abuse, but that she had done nothing to intervene, and partly blames herself for the death of her sister.

Hall credited her personal experience with domestic violence for the drive to host Deadline: Crime. In a blog post published by Hall for Today, she wrote about the struggles of talking about her sister and her unsolved murder. Initially, she was afraid to speak out because she thought she "would be seen as exploiting the problem". She did not decide to take action until years later.

In 2014, Today launched the "Shine A Light" campaign, where the show's anchors each picked a cause to support throughout that year. Hall chose to fight against domestic abuse, with the goal to create a PSA for schools and camps that would spread awareness of emotionally and physically abusive teenage relationships. Hall's fundraising efforts raised over $40,000 and benefited Day One New York, which helps to fight dating abuse.

== Personal life ==
In 2017, Hall began dating music executive Steven Greener. In early 2019, the couple married and currently live in Harlem. On April 25, 2019, Hall announced that she had given birth to a son.

Hall is a member of the National Association of Black Journalists. She is an honorary member of Alpha Kappa Alpha sorority.
