= Code Academy =

A Code Academy or Coding Academy is a coding bootcamp, a set of intensive classes focusing on computer programming training.

Code Academy or Coding Academy may also refer to:

- Codecademy, an online platform that offers programming classes
