= Skillshare =

Online learning platform

- Type: Private
- Industry: Online learning
- Founded: November 2010; 16 years ago
- Headquarters: New York City, U.S.
- Area served: Worldwide
- Key people: Paul Slavin, CEO
- Website: skillshare.com

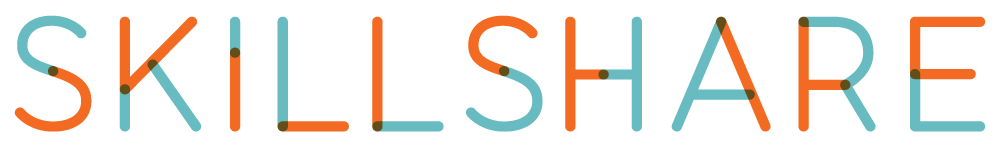
Skillshare previous logo

Skillshare is an online learning community based in the United States that provides educational videos. The courses are unaccredited and are only available through a paid subscription.

Most of the courses focus on interaction, with the primary goal of learning by completing a project.

== History ==
Michael Karnjanaprakorn and Malcolm Ong started Skillshare in New York City in November 2010. The site was live in April 2011. The platform was originally a place where students enrolled in offline courses.

Skillshare hosted Sthe Penny Conference on educational reform in April 2012, with Karnjanaprakorn, Codecademy’s co-founder Zach Sims, and Pencils of Promise founder Adam Braun as speakers.

Skillshare launched online courses in August 2012. By April 2013, it hosted over 150 courses, and launched its School of Design.

In March 2014, Skillshare moved to a membership model for $9.95 a month instead of pay-per-course model. Later that year, the company became an open platform, where anyone could be a course instructor, and introduced a free membership option to watch a limited amount of class content each month. In May 2016, the site had 5 million users.

As of 2020, the company had raised $108 million in funding.

In September 2021, Skillshare discontinued the option of offering classes for free and required users to have either a paid membership or a free trial to access all courses, including those that were previously available for free. As of 2021, it hosted 35,000 courses, on topics like business, art, filmmaking, web development, photography, music, and writing.

In August 2025, Paul Slavin was appointed as CEO of Skillshare, replacing Matt Cooper after 8 years.

== See also ==
- Coursera
- FutureLearn
- LinkedIn Learning
- Udemy
