= Switch Up =

Switch Up may refer to:

- Switch Up (Big Sean song)
- Switch Up (R. Kelly song)
- SwitchUp, an online coding and computing programing platform
