= SwitchUp =

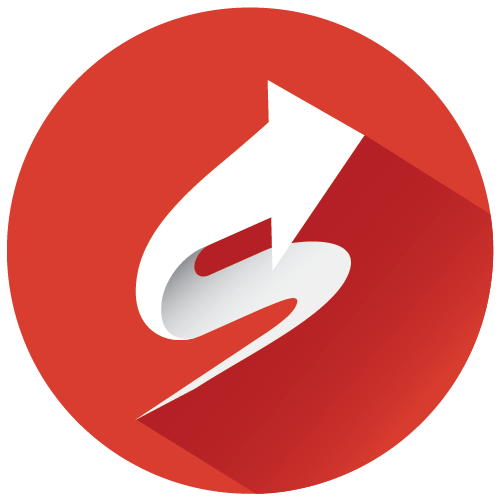
- Company type: Private
- Founded: 2014
- Headquarters: Kirkland, Washington, United States
- Area served: Worldwide
- Founders: Jonathan Lau; Michael Suen
- Industry: Internet
- Services: Technology education
- Website: https://www.switchup.org/
- Commercial: Yes
- Launched: August 2014
- Current status: Active

SwitchUp is an online coding and computing programing platform. Students use the website to research online and offline programming courses by reading alumni reviews, connecting with mentors in the forum, taking an online quiz, and reading industry studies. SwitchUp only accepts reviews from verified alumni and has a verification process.

== History ==
SwitchUp was started by Jonathan Lau after attending a coding bootcamp in Boston. He launched SwitchUp with a small team, and left the first review on the website.

SwitchUp aims to add transparency to the technology education industry. The website was launched in August 2014.

== Product ==
As of October 2020, the site had over 20,000 reviews of 1000 different programming bootcamps and courses across 30 different countries. Switch guides students on a career path, recommends bootcamps, and aggregates alumni reviews.

== Research Publications and Rankings ==
SwitchUp regularly publishes industry research and bootcamp rankings. They also put out data science, cyber security, and web design rankings.

They also offer scholarship information and listings for bootcamps that accept the GI Bill.

In a job outcomes study conducted by researchers published on Dec 1, 2016, the following trends were found:

- 63% of graduates reported increase in salary
- 80% of graduates reported they were 'satisfied' or 'very satisfied'
- Average class size is 30 students with a 1-to-3.8 student instructor ratio
- A one-tailed paired-difference test showed that the increase in salary was statistically significant at the 95% level

SwitchUp also published the 2018 best coding bootcamp rankings on December 31, 2018.

== See also ==
- Code.org
- Codecademy
- Team Treehouse
- Udacity
- Dev Bootcamp
