= Jared Hecht =

American entrepreneur (born c. 1987)

- Born: c. 1987, March 11th
- Education: Columbia University
- Occupation: Businessman
- Known for: Founder of Fundera, Co-founder of GroupMe

Jared Hecht is an American entrepreneur, and the co-founder and CEO of Fundera, an online small business lending aggregator as well as group messaging app GroupMe.

== Early life ==
Hecht studied political science at Columbia University, where he received his bachelor's degree in 2009. While a student at Columbia, he was the managing director and publisher for the university's student-written guidebook, Inside New York.

== Career ==
Hecht was an early employee at Tumblr and led business development. In 2010, Hecht co-founded group messaging app, GroupMe, which allows users to create a private group to which they can send text messages or make conference calls, with his friend Steve Martocci, founder of Blade and Splice who was then a software engineer with Gilt Groupe. They won the South by Southwest breakout ward in 2011. The two raised $11 million from Khosla Ventures and General Catalyst in 2011. After being live for 370 days, Microsoft purchased GroupMe for $80 million.

One of Hecht's early hires at GroupMe, Zach Sims, also a Columbia alumnus, went on to found the online code-learning platform Codecademy.

Hecht later became an angel investor and invested in companies such as Sweetgreen, TransferWise, and Flatiron Health. In October 2013, he launched Fundera, an online broker that helps small businesses get loans from non-bank lenders, after seeing a family member struggle with bank loans, and raised a total of $18.9 million for his platform from investors such as Khosla Ventures, First Round Capital, David Tisch, and more. A year since it was launched, the company has secured more than $60 million in credit for 1,200 small-business owners.

In 2015, he was named in Forbes' "30 under 30" list for the Consumer Tech category.

== Personal life ==
He is married to Carrie Weprin, a film producer, and the couple live in Brooklyn with their two children.
