= Waiting for "Superman" =

- Theatrical release poster
- Directed by: Davis Guggenheim
- Written by: Davis Guggenheim; Billy Kimball
- Produced by: Lesley Chilcott
- Starring: Geoffrey Canada
- Cinematography: Bob Richman; Erich Roland
- Edited by: Jay Cassidy; Greg Finton; Kim Roberts
- Music by: Christophe Beck
- Production companies: Participant Media; Walden Media
- Distributed by: Paramount Pictures (under Paramount Vantage)
- Release dates: January 22, 2010 (Sundance); September 24, 2010 (United States)
- Running time: 111 minutes
- Country: United States
- Language: English
- Box office: $6.4 million

Waiting for "Superman" is a 2010 American documentary film written and directed by Davis Guggenheim and produced by Lesley Chilcott. The film criticizes the American public education system by following several students as they strive to be accepted into competitive charter schools such as KIPP LA Schools, Harlem Success Academy and Summit Preparatory Charter High School.

== Synopsis ==
Geoffrey Canada describes his journey as an educator and recounts the story of his devastation when, as a child, he discovers that Superman is fictional, that "there is no one coming with enough power to save us."

Throughout the documentary, different aspects of the American public education system are examined. Things such as the ease in which a public school teacher achieves tenure, the inability to fire a teacher who is tenured, and how the system attempts to reprimand poorly performing teachers are shown to affect the educational environment. Teaching standards are called into question as there is often conflicting bureaucracy between teaching expectations at the school, state, or federal level.

The film also examines teacher's unions. Michelle Rhee, the former chancellor of the Washington, D.C. public schools (the district with some of the worst-performing students at the time), is shown attempting to take on the union agreements that teachers are bound to, but suffers a backlash from the unions and the teachers themselves.

Statistical comparisons are made between the different types of primary or secondary educational institutions available: state school, private school, and charter school. There are also comparisons made between schools in affluent neighborhoods versus schools in poorer ones. Since charter schools do not operate with the same restrictions as public institutions, they are depicted as having a more experimental approach to educating students.

Since many charter schools are not large enough to accept all of their applicants, the selection of students is done by lottery. The film follows several families as they attempt to gain access to prominent charter schools for their children.

== Details ==
=== Cast ===
- Geoffrey Canada
- The Esparza Family
- The Luka Family
- The Jones Family
- The Black Family
- Michelle Rhee
- Bill Strickland
- Randi Weingarten
- Eric Hanushek
- The Zell Family

=== Release ===
Waiting for "Superman" premiered in the US on September 24, 2010, in theaters in New York and Los Angeles, with a rolling wider release that began on October 1, 2010. During its opening weekend in New York City and Los Angeles, the film grossed $141,000 in four theaters, averaging $35,250 per theater.

=== Promotion ===
Bill Gates, who is interviewed in the documentary, helped to promote the film, appearing at its premier at the Sundance Film Festival and the Toronto International Film Festival. Gates decided to promote the film after director Davis Guggenheim gave a private screening, soon after which the film was acquired by Paramount Pictures.

At the 2010 NBC Education Nation, Joe Scarborough and Mika Brzezinski held a town hall discussing the documentary.

Oprah Winfrey discussed Waiting for "Superman" with Guggenheim on an episode of her show dedicated to education reform, during which Mark Zuckerberg announced $100 million pledge to New Jersey public schools.

== Reception ==
The film has earned both praise and negative criticism from commentators, reformers, and educators. On Rotten Tomatoes the film has an approval rating of 90% based on reviews from 118 critics. The site's consensus states: "Gripping, heartbreaking, and ultimately hopeful, Waiting for "Superman" is an impassioned indictment of the American school system from An Inconvenient Truth director Davis Guggenheim." On Metacritic it has a score of 81% based on reviews from 31 critics.

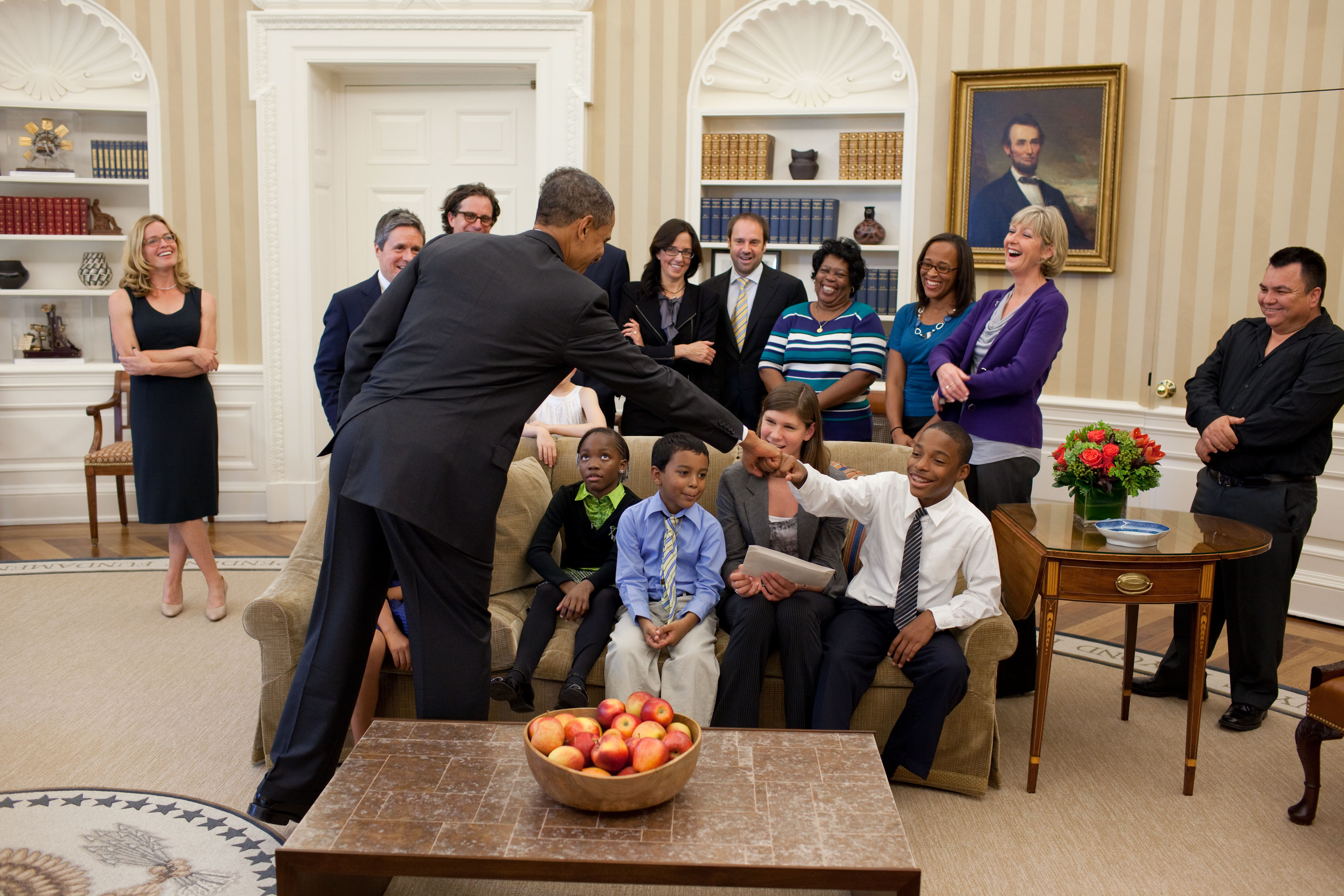
President Barack Obama greets some of the documentary's subjects at the White House.

Roger Ebert gave the film three and a half out of four and wrote, "What struck me most of all was Geoffrey Canada's confidence that a charter school run on his model can make virtually any first-grader a high school graduate who's accepted to college. A good education, therefore, is not ruled out by poverty, uneducated parents or crime – and drug-infested neighborhoods. In fact, those are the very areas where he has success." Scott Bowles of USA Today lauded the film for its focus on the students: "it's hard to deny the power of Guggenheim's lingering shots on these children." Joe Morgenstern, writing for The Wall Street Journal, gave a positive review writing, "when the future of public education is being debated with unprecedented intensity", the film "makes an invaluable addition to the debate". Lisa Schwarzbaum of Entertainment Weekly gave the film an A−, calling it "powerful, passionate, and potentially revolution-inducing". The Hollywood Reporter focused on Geoffrey Canada's performance as "both the most inspiring and a consistently entertaining speaker", while also noting it "isn't exhaustive in its critique". Variety characterized the film's production quality as "deserving every superlative" and felt that "the film is never less than buoyant, thanks largely to the dedicated and effective teachers on whom Guggenheim focuses". Geraldo Rivera praised the film for promoting discussion of educational issues. Deborah Kenny, CEO and founder of the Harlem Village Academies, made positive reference to the film in a The Wall Street Journal op-ed piece about education reform.

The film was praised by some conservative critics. The Wall Street Journal's William McGurn praised the film in an op-ed piece, calling it a "stunning liberal exposé of a system that consigns American children who most need a decent education to our most destructive public schools". Forbes' Melik Kaylan similarly liked the film, writing, "I urge you all to drop everything and go see the documentary Waiting For "Superman" at the earliest opportunity."

The film also received criticism. Andrew O'Hehir of Salon wrote a negative review, writing that while there's "a great deal that's appealing," there's also "as much in this movie that is downright baffling". Melissa Anderson of The Village Voice was critical of the film for not including enough details of outlying socioeconomic issues, writing, "macroeconomic responses to Guggenheim's query…go unaddressed in Waiting for "Superman", which points out the vast disparity in resources for inner-city versus suburban schools only to ignore them."

=== Accolades ===
Award	Date	Category	Nominee	Result	Ref.
Sundance Film Festival	2010	Audience Award for Best Documentary	Waiting for "Superman"	Won	
Gotham Awards	November 29, 2010	Audience Award	Waiting for "Superman"	Won	
Satellite Awards	December 19, 2010	Best Documentary Film	Davis Guggenheim	Nominated	
Critics' Choice Movie Awards	January 14, 2011	Best Documentary Feature	Waiting for "Superman"	Won	
Critics' Choice Movie Awards	January 14, 2011	Best Song	"Shine" – John Legend	Nominated	
Directors Guild of America Awards	January 29, 2011	Outstanding Directorial Achievement in Documentary	Davis Guggenheim	Nominated	
NAACP Image Awards	March 4, 2011	Outstanding Documentary	Lesley Chilcott	Nominated	
San Diego Film Festival	2010	Best Documentary	Waiting for "Superman"	Won	
San Diego Film Festival	2010	Audience Award for Best Documentary	Waiting for "Superman"	Won	

== Educational reception and allegations of inaccuracy ==
Studies done by Stanford University in 2009 and 2013 found that, on average, charter schools perform about the same and are as likely to perform better as they are to perform worse than their counterparts in traditional public schools.

Author and academic Rick Ayers lambasted the accuracy of the film, describing it as "a slick marketing piece full of half-truths and distortions" and criticizing its focus on standardized testing. In Ayers's view, the "corporate powerhouses and the ideological opponents of all things public" have employed the film to "break the teacher's unions and to privatize education", while driving teachers' wages even lower and running "schools like little corporations". Lastly, Ayers writes that "schools are more segregated today than before Brown v. Board of Education in 1954," and thus criticized the film for not mentioning that "black and brown students are being suspended, expelled, searched, and criminalized".

Diane Ravitch, Research Professor of Education at New York University and a nonresident senior fellow at the Brookings Institution, similarly criticizes the film's lack of accuracy. The most substantial distortion, according to Ravitch, is the claim that "70 percent of eighth-grade students cannot read at grade level", a misrepresentation of data from the National Assessment of Educational Progress. Ravitch served as a board member with the NAEP and says that "the NAEP doesn't measure performance in terms of grade-level achievement", as claimed in the film, but only as "advanced", "proficient", and "basic". The film assumes that any student below proficient is "below grade level", but this claim is not supported by the NAEP data. Ravitch says that a study by Stanford University economist Margaret Raymond of 5000 charter schools found that only 17% are superior in math test performance to a matched public school, and many perform badly, casting doubt on the film's claim that privately managed charter schools are the solution to bad public schools. One of the reasons for the high test scores, writes Ravitch, is that many charter schools expel low-performing students to bring up their average scores. Ravitch also writes that many charter schools are involved in "unsavory real estate deals".

In 2011, many news media reported on a testing score "cheating scandal" at Rhee's schools, because the test answer sheets contained a suspiciously high number of erasures that changed wrong answers to right answers. They asked Rhee whether the pressure on teachers led them to cheat. Rhee said that only a small number of teachers and principals cheated. Ravitch said that "cheating, teaching to bad tests, institutionalized fraud, dumbing down of tests, and a narrowed curriculum" were the true outcomes of Rhee's tenure in D.C. schools.

== Book release ==
There is also a companion book titled Waiting For "Superman": How We Can Save America's Failing Public Schools.

== See also ==
- Chalk (film)
- The Cartel
- Charter school
- Education in the United States
- Harlem Children's Zone
- Magnet school
- SEED Foundation
- The Lottery (2010 film)
- Won't Back Down (film)
