= NewsNation with Tamron Hall =

- Presented by: Tamron Hall
- Country of origin: United States
- Original language: English

Production
- Running time: 60 minutes

Original release
- Network: MSNBC
- Release: October 11, 2010 – February 1, 2017

NewsNation with Tamron Hall is an American weekday talk-news program that was broadcast on MSNBC between 2010 and 2017. It launched on October 11, 2010. Tamron Hall anchored the hour broadcast from New York. The show concentrated on high-profile interviews and the latest U.S., world and entertainment news. When a story was deemed breaking news, MSNBC producers had the discretion to replace Hall with Breaking News Anchor Brian Williams.

== Segments ==
- Gut Check - Tamron asked viewers to give their opinion (using her Newsvine) on some of the most controversial stories in the news.
