= Karel (programming language) =

Programming language

Karel the Robot
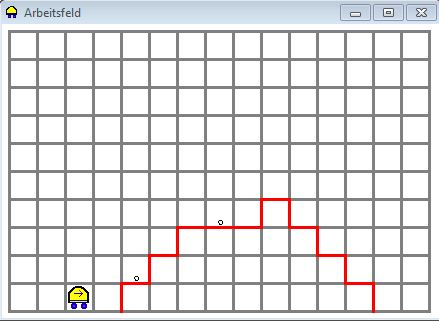
- Paradigm: procedural
- Designed by: Richard E. Pattis
- First appeared: 1981
- Website: xkarel.sourceforge.net

Dialects
- Some localized language variants

Influenced by
- Pascal

Influenced
- Karel++, AgentSheets, Guido van Robot

Karel is an educational programming language for beginners, created by Richard E. Pattis in his book Karel The Robot: A Gentle Introduction to the Art of Programming. Pattis used the language in his courses at Stanford University, California. The language is named after Karel Čapek, a Czech writer who introduced the word robot in his play R.U.R.

== Principles ==
A program in Karel is used to control a simple robot named Karel that lives in an environment consisting of a grid of streets (left-right) and avenues (up-down). Karel understands five basic instructions: move (Karel moves by one square in the direction he is facing), turnLeft (Karel turns 90 ° left), putBeeper (Karel puts a beeper on the square he is standing at), pickBeeper (Karel lifts a beeper off the square he is standing at), and turnoff (Karel switches himself off, the program ends). Karel can also perform boolean queries about his immediate environment, asking whether there is a beeper where he is standing, whether there are barriers next to him, and about the direction he is facing. A programmer can create additional instructions by defining them in terms of the five basic instructions, and by using conditional control flow statements if and while with environment queries, and by using the iterate construct.

=== Example ===
The following is a simple example of Karel syntax:

BEGINNING-OF-PROGRAM
 
 DEFINE turnRight AS
 BEGIN
   turnLeft;
   turnLeft;
   turnLeft;
 END
 
 BEGINNING-OF-EXECUTION
   ITERATE 3 TIMES
   BEGIN
     turnRight;
     move
   END
   turnoff
 END-OF-EXECUTION
 
END-OF-PROGRAM

== Specification ==
The following implementation is Karel in the Python programming language. Other implementations are available.

=== Primitive functions ===
The following are the primitive functions.

move()
Karel moves one square in the direction it is facing.
turn_left()
Karel turns left by 90 degrees.
put_beeper()
Karel puts a beeper on its current square.
pick_beeper()
Karel picks up a beeper from its current square.
paint_corner(COLOR_NAME)
Karel paints its current corner with a color. There is a finite list of available colors.

=== Program Structures ===
Karel programs are structured in the following way:

- Comments: Any line starting with # is a comment and is ignored by the interpreter.
- Functions in Karel are declared using def, followed by the function name and parentheses. The body of the function follows in subsequent lines.
- main(): A program run executes the main function. The other functions are not executed unless called.

=== Conditions in Karel ===
Karel can respond to certain conditions in its world:

front_is_clear(), beepers_present(), beepers_in_bag(), left_is_clear(), right_is_clear(), facing_north(), facing_south(), facing_east(), and facing_west()

And their inverses:

front_is_blocked(), no_beepers_present(), no_beepers_in_bag(), left_is_blocked(), right_is_blocked(), not_facing_north(), not_facing_south(), not_facing_east(), and not_facing_west().

It can also check the current block's color by corner_color_is(COLOR_NAME).

=== Conditions and Loops ===
There are two control structures:

- Conditional execution using if and else.
- Loops using for and while.

== Variants and descendants ==
The language has inspired the development of various clones and similar educational languages. As the language is intended for beginners, localized variants exist in some languages, notably Czech (the programming language was quite popular in Czechoslovakia).

The principles of Karel were updated to the object-oriented programming paradigm in a new programming language called Karel++. Karel++ is conceptually based on Karel, but uses a completely new syntax, similar to Java.

A REALbasic implementation, rbKarel, provides the basic Karel commands within an RBScript environment with BASIC syntax being used for loops and conditionals. This teaching project provides a cross-platform GUI for Karel experiments including single-stepping and spoken output.

A Karel-inspired language and environment called Robot Emil uses a 3D view of the robot's world. Robot Emil offers a large palette of objects that can be placed to depict walls, windows (transparency), water and grass. The camera may be moved freely throughout the 3D environment. The robot may be controlled interactively with buttons in the GUI, or by programs written in Emil's Karel-like programming language. The author states that the program is free for use by schools, students and children. Versions are available in English, Czech and Slovak.

A proprietary language which is also called Karel is used to program the robots of FANUC Robotics. However, FANUC Karel is derived from Pascal.

The language has also been implemented as Karel the Dog in JavaScript by CodeHS. Similar to the original language, this implementation features Karel in a grid world. Programmers use and build upon Karel's simple vocabulary of commands to accomplish programming tasks. Instead of putting and picking beepers, Karel the Dog puts and takes tennis balls.

A German version of Karel is named "Robot Karol".

== See also ==
- Educational programming language
- RoboMind - An educational alternative programming environment
- RUR-PLE - another "learn Python" tool based on ideas in Karel
- CodeHS - introductory computer science education using Karel in JavaScript
