= Zach Sims =

American entrepreneur

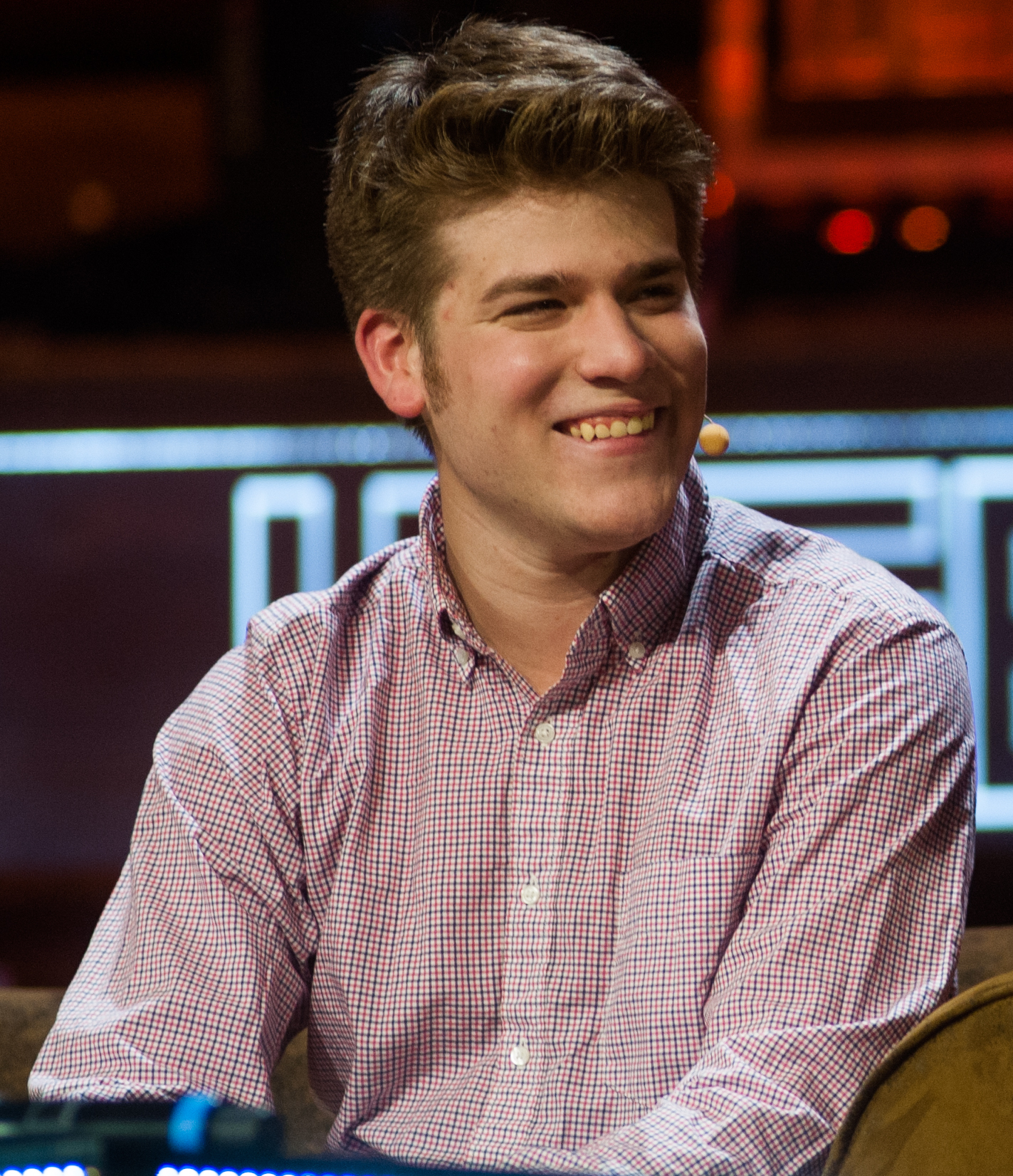
- Sims in 2012
- Education: Columbia University
- Occupation: Businessman
- Known for: Co-founder of Codecademy

Zach Sims (born 1990) is an American entrepreneur who was the CEO and a co-founder of Codecademy, an online platform offering interactive coding lessons and tutorials.Calvelli

== Biography ==
When Sims was 13, he started to email manufacturers with the idea to build a waterproof iPod case, showing his ambition for tech at a young age.

Sims later entered Columbia University with the class of 2012, as a political science major.

During his junior year, he realized that most of the students did not have the skill set relevant to their job search. He also worked for GroupMe, founded by his college friend Jared Hecht, after seeing him demo the application at TechCrunch Disrupt in 2010. However, he was frustrated with the lack of effective programming courses. As a result, he decided to teach himself coding with the help of his friend Ryan Bubinski, whom he met while working for the Columbia Daily Spectator. The two built the first version of Codecademy to teach Sims how to program.

In 2011, Sims and Bubinski were accepted into Y Combinator's summer program. That summer, Sims launched Codecademy with Bubinski and dropped out of college, a year before graduation. In 2011, the startup was the runner-up of TechCrunch's Best New Startup awards, losing to Pinterest. During the first weekend of the launch, it attracted more than 200,000 users and had 1 million users by the end of 2011. As of 2021, Codecademy has a user base of 45 million users. In December 2021, Skillsoft agreed to acquire Codecademy in a cash-and-stock transaction valued at $525 million. The acquisition closed in April 2022, when Sims joined Skillsoft's executive leadership team as Codecademy's CEO.

In 2013, Sims was named one of the finalists of the Time 100. In 2015, Sims attended the World Economic Forum.

Zach has been named to Inc. Magazine’s 30 Under 30 list
