= Sketchbook =

Book designed for sketching and drawing

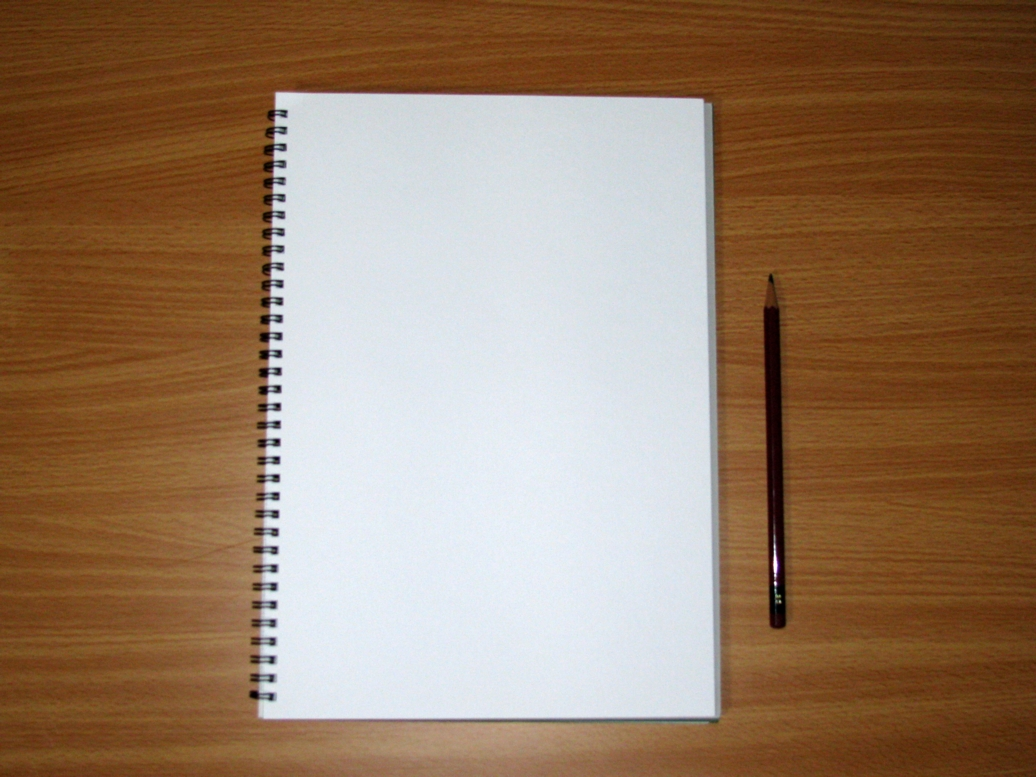
Sketchbook and pencil

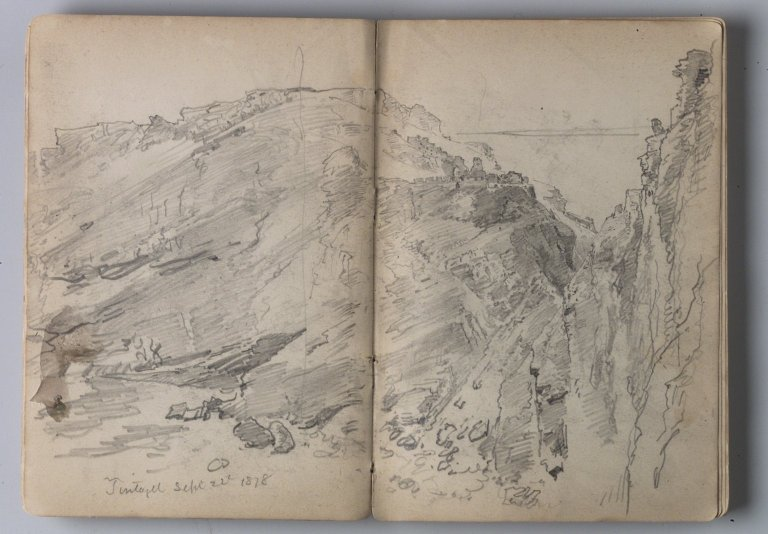
"Sketchbook of English Landscape and Coastal Scenery," by the artist William Trost Richards, at the Brooklyn Museum

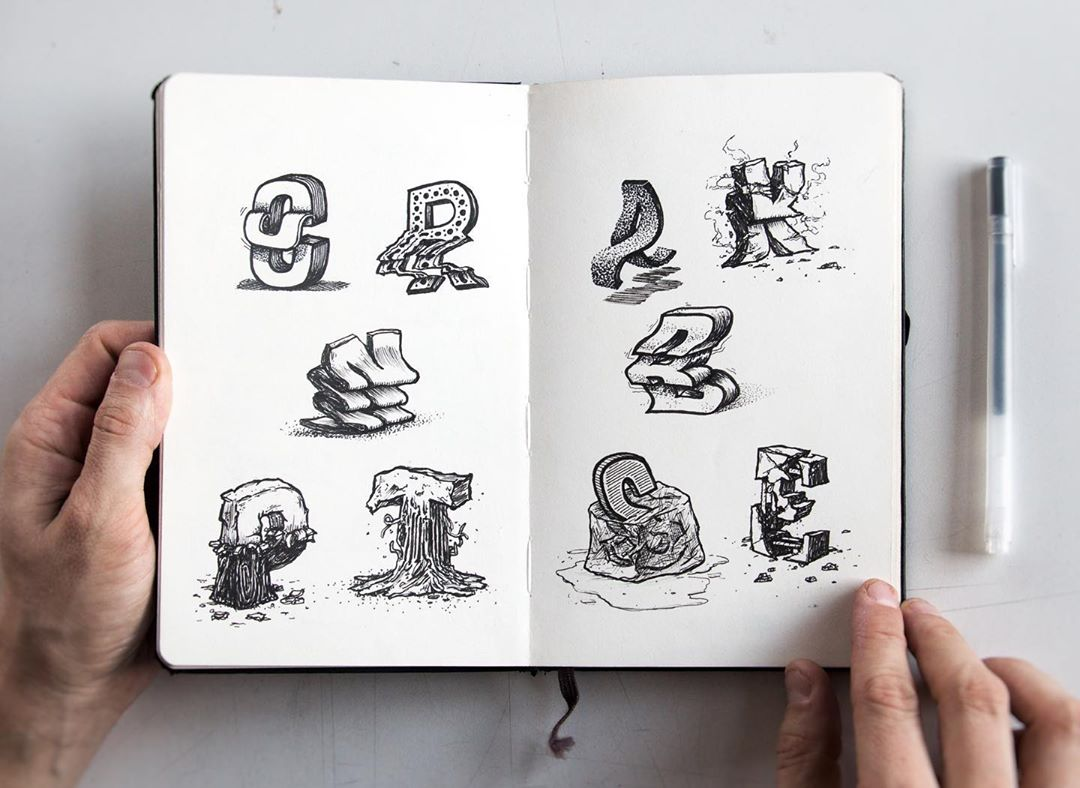
Rylsee's sketchbook (Berlin, 2019)

A sketchbook is a book or pad with blank pages for sketching and is frequently used by artists for drawing or painting as a part of their creative process. Some also use sketchbooks as a sort of blueprint for future art pieces.

The exhibition of sketchbooks at the Fogg Art Museum at Harvard University in 2006 suggested that there were two broad categories for classifying sketches:

- Observation: this focuses on the documentation of the external world and includes many such travel and nature studies and sketches recording an artist's travels.
- Invention: this follows the artists' digressions and internal journeys as they develop compositional ideas.

== Types of sketchbooks ==
Sketchbooks come in a wide variety of shapes and sizes, with varied covers, and differing numbers of pages. Sketchbooks began as a way to provide a readily available supply of drawing paper in the convenient form of a book. The finish of work found in the sketchbook varies widely depending on the artist and their style of work, with some having very simple drawings and notes, and some having highly worked images. Over time, it might allow others to see the artist's progress, as their style and skills develop. Many artists personalize their sketchbook by decorating the covers. Sketches are sometimes removed from sketchbooks at a later date.

Sketchbooks made out of high quality paper, differentiated by weight (referring to density of the sheets) and tooth (also called grain), allow for a wide variety of techniques to be used, ranging from pencil drawings, to watercolor, to colored pencil, to pen and ink, and so on. Certain paper characteristics might be more desirable for use with certain mediums. Sketchbook paper comes in a variety of tones, ranging from pure white, to cream, and includes less common varieties, such as gray.

In displays of contemporary art, as well as historical retrospectives, intimate and ephemeral records are increasingly valued, resulting in the exhibition of sketchbooks alongside "finished" artworks.

In Japan, fans often bring sketchbooks to dōjinshi (independent manga or fanzine) conventions to get drawings from their favorite artists.

Computer technology has allowed for the development of digital sketchbooks, such as Apple's iPad devices and Microsoft's Surface tablets.

== Online sketchbooks ==
The internet has increased access to documents such as the sketchbooks of famous artists which previously would only be seen in an exhibition. A number of the sketchbooks of famous artists have been digitally recorded and are now available online. Links are provided in the external links section below.

- Leonardo da Vinci (Italian 1452–1519) made hundreds of pages of sketchbooks during his life, filled with drawings and writings that went along with his very curious mind, you can find some of his sketchbook pages at the following link:
  - www.unmuseum.org
- Rembrandt van Rijn (Dutch 1606–1669) Good example of Rembrandt's sketches and drawings can be found in:
  - the British Museum and
  - Getty Museum – sketch of an artist in his studio
- Goya (Spanish 1746- 1828) was a painter and print maker and made an important contribution to the art of drawing.
  - The Italian Sketchbook created in the 1770s and currently in the Museo del Prado
  - Eight albums of sketchbooks by Goya This link provides a summary of each of the albums, what it contains and what materials were used — the site is still under construction.
  - sketchbook drawings held by Museum of Fine Art in Boston
- J. M. W. Turner (English 1775–1851) produced 300 sketchbooks and around 30,000 sketches and watercolours on his travels. Five years after his death, the majority of his art was bequeathed to the nation and is housed at Tate Britain
  - Turner sketchbooks, Turner Bequest, Tate Britain This link provides access to all 300 sketchbooks.
- John Constable (English 1776–1837) believed in the importance of working from life and based his paintings on sketches and drawings of the landscape. Some of his sketches were in oil while others were in small sketchbooks. This is an example of a Sketchbook at the Victoria and Albert Museum
- Conrad Martens (English 1801–1878) accompanied Darwin on the Beagle as expedition artist and produced three detailed sketchbooks of places visited and objects seen on the expedition. This is the itinerary of the expedition and this is the story of his sketchbooks from the Beagle expedition which are in the Cambridge University Library. This is a categorised list of sketchbook images. Most of the sketchbook images are in graphite. Click on a link to see images and on an image to see a larger image and more detail about it.
- Paul Cézanne (French 1839–1906) worked from life and made detailed observations of form in his drawings and sketches as well as his paintings. Dover Publications has reproduced one of Cézanne's sketchbooks
- Vincent van Gogh (Dutch 1853–1890) made preliminary drawings (sketches) prior to developing his paintings. He often drew with a reed pen and ink. Students of mark-making will probably be interested in the great range of marks he used routinely.
  - Examples from the 2005 exhibition of Van Gogh Drawings at the Metropolitan Museum, New York
- John Singer Sargent (1856–1925) Sargent at Harvard — the Harvard University Art Museums' collection of sketchbooks
- Various American Artists: Sketchbooks in the Archives of American Art — the curators' choice of 17 sketchbooks "demonstrates the broad range of material available for research at the Archives of American Art from academic notebooks with anatomical studies to illustrated journals, ranging in date from the 1840s to the 1970s."
- Henry Moore (English 1898–1986): early drawings (1916-1939) of ideas / for sculptures
- David Hockney (contemporary) has issued a DVD of fifteen palm-sized sketchbooks (of 25) produced during a period of 18 months in 2002–2003 (copyright/published by David Hockney/Gregory Evans Inc.). The sketches chronicle his home, his studio, his travels, landscapes, still lifes, hotel rooms, his friends and their families.
- Xavier Pick (English 1972– ): A life in sketchbooks contemporary illustrator who has been drawing constantly in his sketchbooks both personal and internationally, most notably as a war artist.

== See also ==
- Painting
- Oil sketch
