= Rylsee =

Swiss artist

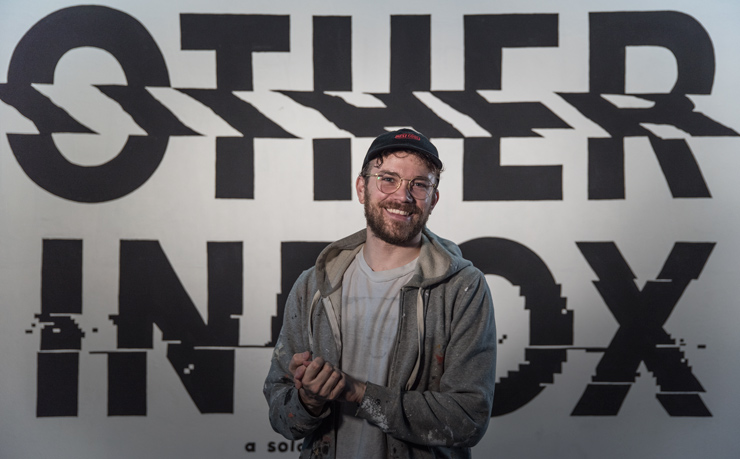
- Known for: Typography; Hand-drawn font Murals
- Website: rylsee.com

Rylsee (born Cyril Vouilloz) is a Swiss artist specialising in hand-drawn font and typography living in Berlin, Germany.

Rylsee is known for wordplay and relatable designs. His ongoing themes include observations of his daily life and commenting on the digital world, especially regarding smartphone culture and his sense of humour. His numbered sketchbooks have received attention from fans and media since he began collating them in 2010.

Rylsee is a hybrid-artist who employs a range of mediums. He is also one of the original members and resident artists of the Berlin arts & music venue, Urban Spree.

== Artistic style ==
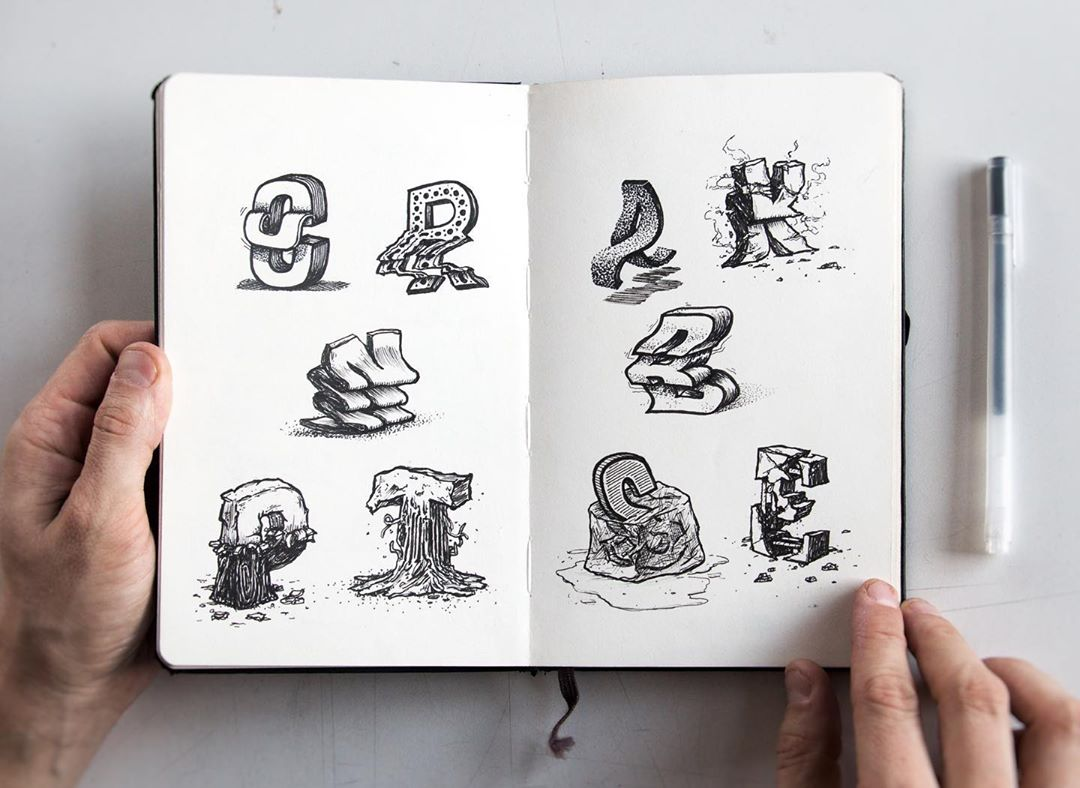
Rylsee's sketchbook (Berlin, 2019)

Rylsee works in a range of different art forms including; typography, hand-drawn lettering, illustration, murals, graffiti, sculpture, GIFs and graphic design.

Coming from graffiti origins, Rylsee is known for working very fast when creating public art. A selection of his more notable murals include; 'I Wish You Were As Cute As Your Profile Picture' – Dead Chicken Alley, Berlin (2015), ‘Mural Germinar Futuro’ – Santiago (2021), 'Where The Sidewalk Ends' – Tel Aviv (2014). He has also been invited to various mural festivals including; Vision Arts Festival (2017), POW!WOW! DC (2018) and UPAINT Monaco (2023).

== Career ==
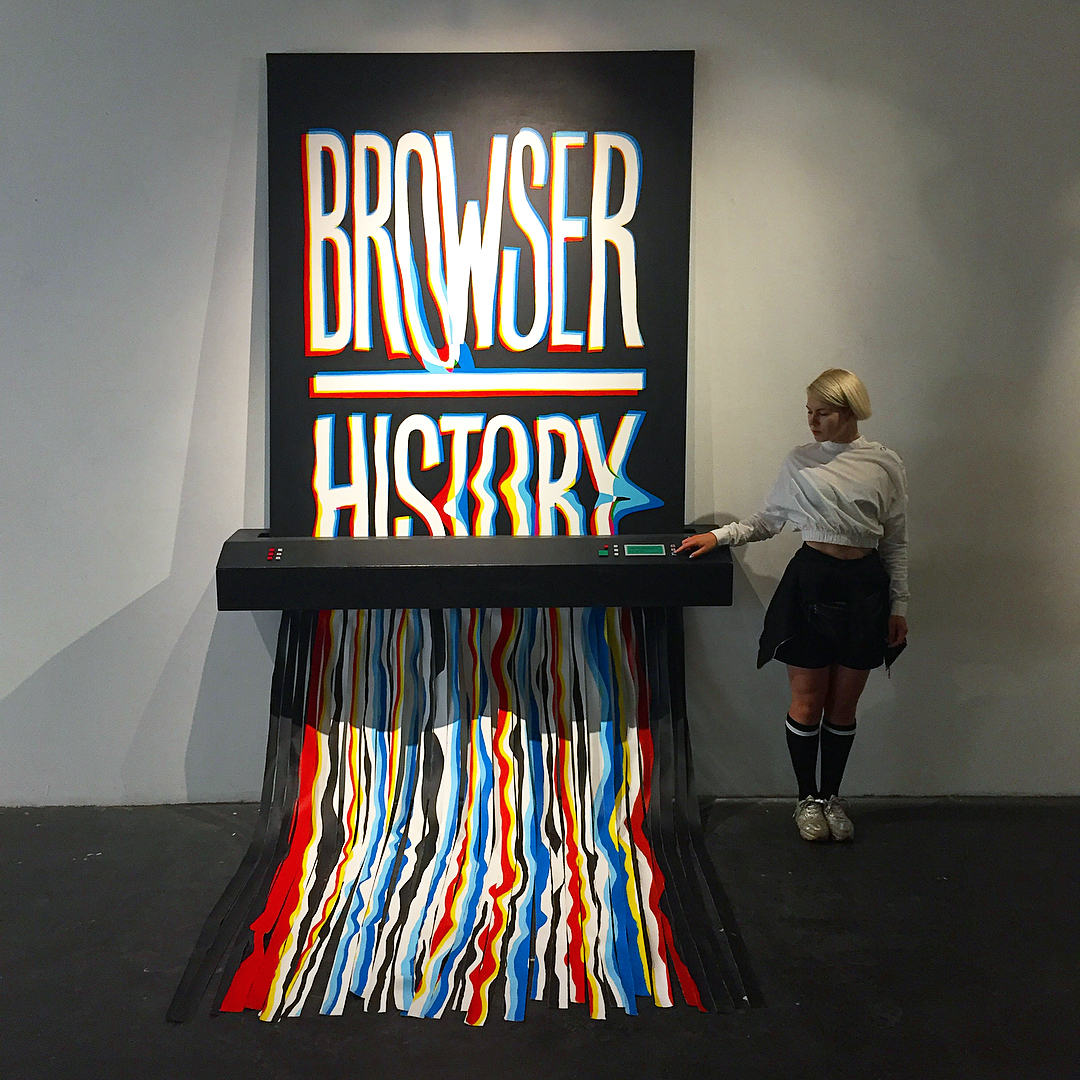
Germany, Artwork titled 'Browser History' from Rylsee's exhibition 'Other Inbox' at Urban Spree in Berlin, 2017

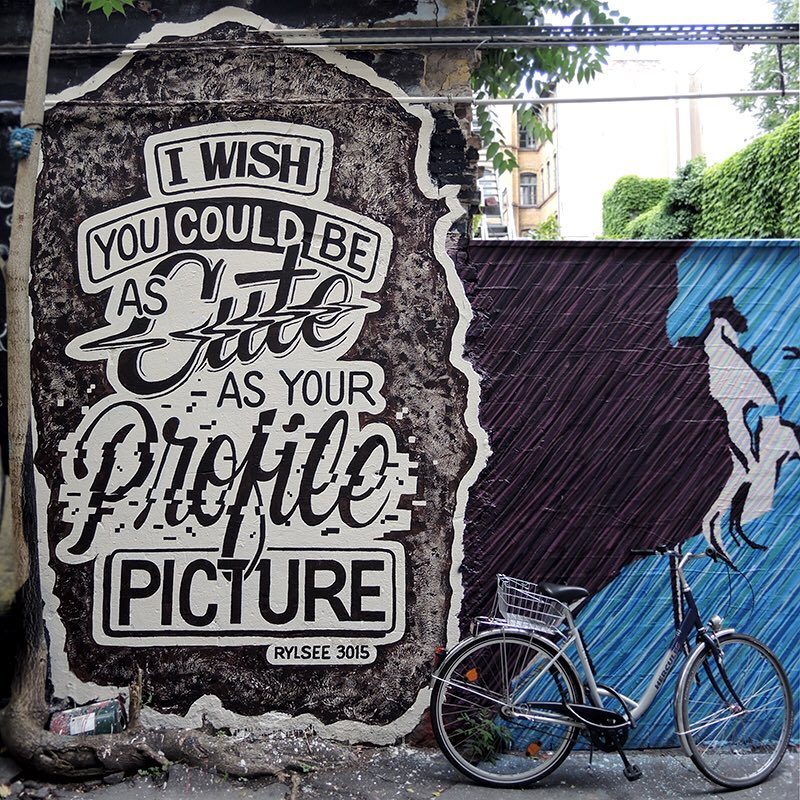
Germany, 'I Wish You Were As Cute As Your Profile Picture' mural by Rylsee, Dead Chicken Alley – Berlin, 2015

=== 2010 - 2016 ===
In 2011, Rylsee (along with fellow Red Gate Arts Society members; Jamie Bizness, Kevin House, Jim Carrico and Paulo Costa) was invited to exhibit in a collective show titled 'Las Diferencias Que Coexistem' at Central Galeria De Arte Contemporanea in São Paulo.

In 2014 Rylsee completed an artist residency at the Zimmer Gallery in Tel Aviv. Here he debuted his famous 'Guess What' alphabet which has become a recurring project. Shortly after this, he was asked to bring the exhibition to Annecy, France to exhibit at the Art By Friends Gallery.

In collaboration with fellow Swiss artist Ben Thé, Rylsee created a fake 'épicerie' or corner store in which everything was created and made by them. This included false advertisements, packaging, products, television commercials and costumes. The installation was held at the Highlight Gallery in Geneva from November 2015 to February 2016.

=== 2017 - 2020 ===
In 2017, Rylsee collaborated with Italian company Moleskine to publish a book titled 'How to Play with Letters' – a monograph on his career and unique artist style. Also during this year, Rylsee exhibited his largest solo show to date titled 'OTHER INBOX' at Urban Spree.

In September 2019, Rylsee showed a new exhibition titled 'GREY ZONE' at Bahama Yellow in Geneva. Based on his 2014 exhibition idea 'Guess What', the GREY ZONE exhibition housed 2 new alphabets - one series of ink drawings and another series of mix-media pieces. Other activities such as workshops and talks were also held during the time of the exhibition.

=== 2021 - present ===
To celebrate the entry of skateboarding into the Olympic Summer Games programme, Rylsee was commissioned by The Olympic Museum to design a limited-edition olympic skateboard. The project eventually evolved into Rylsee creating a ‘skateable sculpture’ titled ‘A New Chapter’ – the design aimed to “blur the lines between sport and art” - Rylsee, 2022. The sculpture was exhibited at the front of The Olympic Museum in June 2022, before being donated to the city of Lausanne in April 2023, where it has since been permanently installed at the Vidy Bowl skatepark near the IOC headquarters.

In 2023, Rylsee was entrusted with the creation of the official poster for the 58th Montreux Jazz Festival. His poster design plays on the idea that Montreux Jazz Festival is a kind of ‘ephemeral city’– capturing the wild night of festival-goers and their adventures, whether festive, romantic, comical, hallucinatory or subversive. In Rylsee-style, the poster design houses many ‘easter eggs’, including dedications to his family, friends, and references to his style and previous work; including a reference to his own poster, and a tribute to three other Montreux posters.

Some of his clients include; Caran d'Ache, Moleskine, International Olympic Committee, Nike, LinkedIn, Converse, HP, Opinel, Red Bull, KaDeWe, Native Instruments, Nidecker, and Swiss rapper Di-Meh.

==== Rylsee x Caran d'Ache ====
Since 2018, Rylsee has partnered with Swiss art & writing materials manufacturer Caran d'Ache on a wide range of campaigns, exhibitions, products and classes.

In 2022, Rylsee was invited to design a multimedia installation titled ‘NEXT STOP’ in the Espace Créatif Caran d’Ache, located at Plateforme 10, Lausanne. The exhibition pushed spectators to explore their own perception of time through an acrylic kinetic sculpture.

== Projects ==
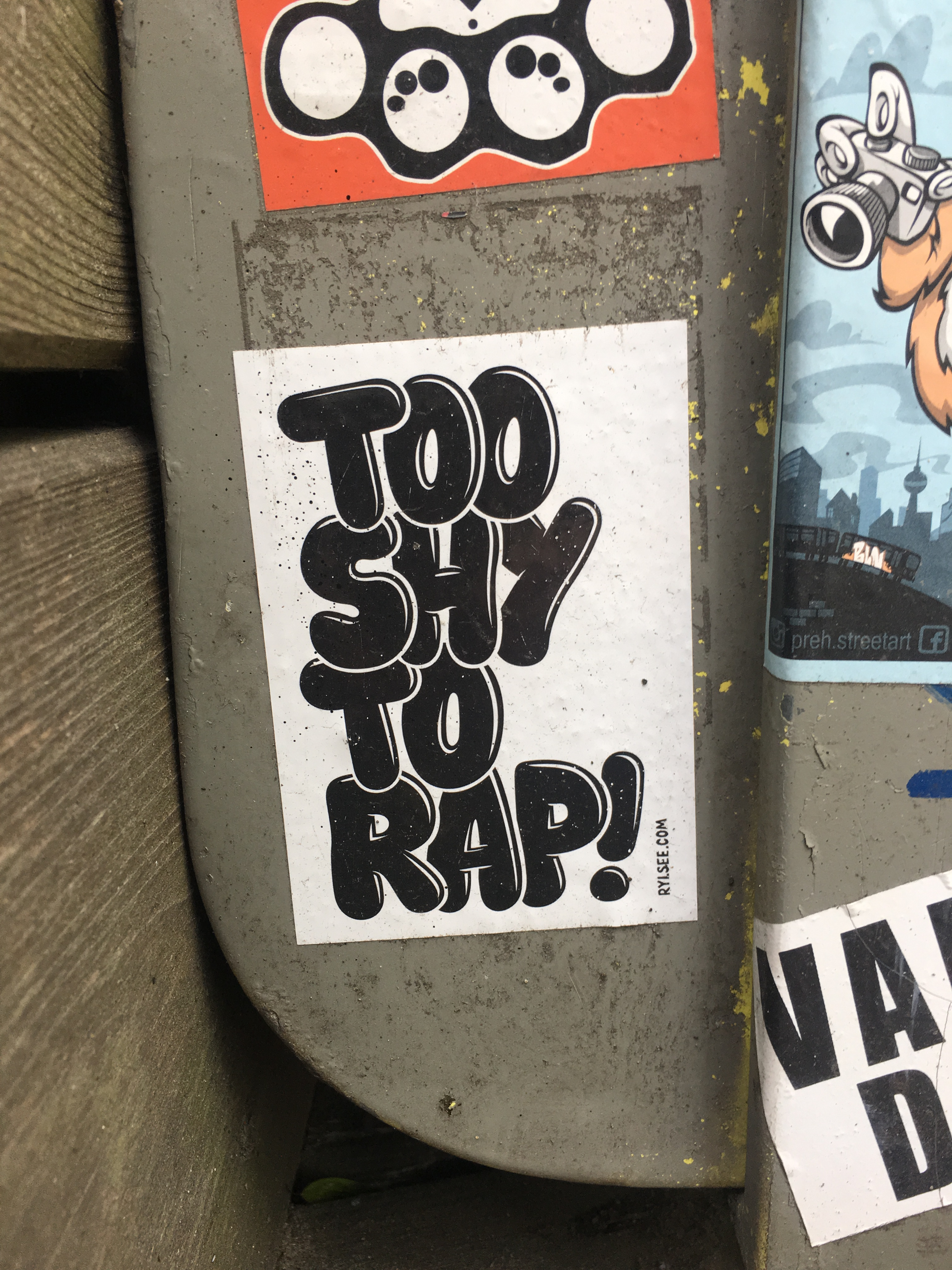
Germany, Too Shy To Rap sticker, Urban Spree – Berlin, 2019

=== TOO SHY TO RAP ===
The Too Shy To Rap design is arguably Rylsee's most popular and widespread design. Originally drawn for his 2013 solo exhibition in Geneva titled 'Bathroom Poetry', Rylsee kept this particular piece because he 'thought it was funny'. He proceeded to print the design as a sticker in replacement of a business card.

=== SNEEER ===
SNEEER was a streetwear project founded by Rylsee and his brother Yann Vouilloz in Berlin in 2016. SNEEER produced a range of unisex apparel, accessories and small goods, Rylsee's 'Too Shy To Rap' merchandise, as well as collaborating with other artists and musicians including; Catnapp (Monkeytown Records) and Furious Few.

== Solo exhibitions ==
- NEXT STOP – Espace Créatif Caran d’Ache Plateforme 10, Lausanne (2022)
- Grey Zone – Bahama Yellow, Geneva (2019)
- Other Inbox – Urban Spree, Berlin (2017)
- Guess What – Art By Friends Gallery (2014)
- Guess What – Zimmer Gallery Tel Aviv (2014)
- Bathroom Poetry – The Square, Geneva (2013)
- Too Old To Die Young – Dockers pop up store, Berlin (2013)
- Ossem Lächli Geets Es Bächli – IDRAWALOT Gallery, Berlin (2012)
- Save Sneeril – RedGate Gallery, Vancouver (2010)
- Work By Rylsee – Hard to Find, Geneva (2009)

== Group shows and festivals ==
- KNOTENPUNKT23 – Affenfaust Galerie, Hamburg (2023)
- UPAINT 2023 – Larvotto Promenade, Monaco (2023)
- CURB Translation L'Art en Mouvement 2023 – The Thabor Barge, Amiens (2023)
- Time to Shine – KaDeWe, Berlin & Altsterhaus, Hamburg (2021)
- Exposition Collective 10 Ans – Mathgoth Galerie, Paris (2020)
- POW! WOW! DC – Allocated Location, Washington DC (2018)
- Opinel Series x Art By Friends – Opinel Museum, France (2018)
- Greetings From Nowhere – SNEEER Pop Up Store, Berlin (2018)
- Punchlines Worldwide Group Show – Art By Friends Gallery (2018)
- Another View – Plastic Murs Gallery, Valencia (2017)
- Urban Spree at La Vallée – La Vallée, Brussels (2016)
- Art Prague – Clam Gallas Palace Prague, Prague (2016)
- Forgotten Memories – Galeria Lira, Santiago (2016)
- L'Èpicerie Dépoto – Highlight Gallery, Geneva (2015–2016)
- Common Fest – La Magnanerie Beirut, Beirut (2015)
- Made in Berlin – Galerie Magoth, Paris (2015)
- Knotenpunkt 15 – Affenfaust Galerie, Hamburg (2015)
- Ride The Wall – La SIP, Geneva (2015)
- Ride The Wall – GAS, Geneva (2014)
- What if..? – Neurotitan Gallery, Berlin & Denver (2014)
- Bromance – Tischedecke, Stuttgart (2014)
- Springtime Delights – Tour de la Lanterne, La Rochelle (2014)
- Art By Friends No. 6 – White & Art Gallery, Brussels (2014)
- Millerntor Gallery – Millerntor Stadium, Hamburg (2014)
- In Yo' Face – Pictoplasma Festival, Berlin (2013)
- Group Show – EBÓ MultiArtes, São Paulo (2013)
- The Circle Show – Urban Spree Gallery, Berlin (2013)
- Burning Ink – The Square, Geneva (2013)
- Group show for upcoming artists – Musée Rath, Geneva (2013)
- Pictobello – Festival International d'illustration, Vevey (2012)
- Tattoo The Girl – MUTUO Centro de Arte, Barcelona (2012)
- Côtlette – The Square, Geneva (2012)
- Las Diferencias Que Coexistem – Central Galeria De Arte Contemporânea, São Paulo (2012)
- Drawuary No. 2 – RedGate Gallery, Vancouver (2011)
- Emergent Genevan Artists – La Mansarde Gallery, Geneva (2011)
- 100 Amigos – El Kartel, Vancouver (2010)
- Rocktober – Davie St Pop-Up Gallery, Vancouver (2010)
- The Monster Mash – RedGate Gallery, Vancouver (2010)
- Dirty Soap Box – RedGate Gallery, Vancouver (2010)
- Art Deck – TranZport Pop-Up gallery, Geneva (2009)

== Bibliography ==
- Rylsee (2017). How to Play with Letters. Moleskine SpA. ISBN 978-8866131618

How To Play With Letters is the first published monograph by Rylsee. It is described by its publisher as a surprising, exciting and playful explanation of contemporary letter art and an ideal guide for anyone with an interest in cutting-edge art and design.

== Appearances ==
=== Guest speaking and conferences ===
- USK Symposium Zürich 2023 – Switzerland (2023)
- Type Thursday – Germany (2023)
- TMX 2022 'Tipografía México' – Mexico (2022)
- Royaume du Web – Geneva (2018)
- Pontificia Universidad Católica de Chile – Chile (2017)

=== Broadcast media and podcasts ===
- RTS 'Couleur 3' – Switzerland (2023)
- RTS – Switzerland (2023)
- M Le Média – Switzerland (2023)
- Typologie – France (2023)
- RTS '3ème Mi-Temps' – Switzerland (2022)
- Domestika – USA (2022)
- RTS 'Dans Sa Bulle' – Switzerland (2022)
- The Olympic Museum Podcast – Switzerland (2022)
- Factory Berlin TV – Germany (2021)
- RTS 'The Raconteurs' – Switzerland (2020)
- Louis Media X Orange.fr – France (2019)
- Tataki/RTS – Switzerland (2018)
- Vantage Point Radio – Germany (2016)
- Skillshare – USA (2015)
- Arte – Germany (2014)
- Converse – Germany (2014)
- Mix TV – Brasil (2011)
