= GroupMe =

Instant messaging software

- Company type: Subsidiary
- Founded: May 2010; 16 years ago
- Headquarters: New York City, United States
- Owner: Microsoft (through Microsoft AI)
- Key people: Jared Hecht; Steve Martocci
- Website: groupme.com

GroupMe (also stylized as groupme) is a mobile group messaging app owned by Microsoft. It was launched in May 2010 by the private company GroupMe. In August 2011, GroupMe delivered over 100 million messages each month and by June 2012, that number jumped to 550 million. In 2013, GroupMe had over 12 million registered users.

In March 2024, reports noted that while Microsoft had discontinued development of Skype for consumers, it continued to actively support GroupMe. The app received recent updates and was highlighted as a messaging platform still maintained by Microsoft, contrasting with the declining attention given to Skype.

== History ==
Grouply, the app that would become GroupMe, was created in May 2010, at a hackathon at the TechCrunch Disrupt conference. Its creators, Jared Hecht and Steve Martocci intended the app to replace email chains as a method of communication. After investors took notice of the app, Hecht and Martocci took a loan from Hecht's parents and began working on their app full-time. The name was changed to GroupMe in August. The same month, GroupMe raised $85,000 from investors. The app was released on the App Store in October 2010.

In January 2011, GroupMe received US$10.6 million in venture capital from Khosla Ventures, General Catalyst Partners, angel investors, and others. In August 2011, Skype acquired the one-year-old start-up for around $80 million. Skype had itself been purchased by Microsoft in May 2011, with the purchase finalized in October 2011. The app underwent a redesign in late 2012.

Initially, groups were limited to 100 members, but a support request could get a group's limit raised as high as necessary as it approached the limit. In 2019, GroupMe stopped offering group member limit increases; however, the app increased the standard limit from 100 to 5000.

Following Skype's downfall and subsequent shutdown, GroupMe would not shut down but rather be moved under the Microsoft AI division and will be integrated with services such as Microsoft Copilot.

== Usage ==
GroupMe works by downloading the app or accessing the service online, and then creating an account by providing your name, cell phone number, and password, or connecting through a Facebook or Twitter account. The service then syncs with your contacts and from that point forward the user can make groups, limited to 5000 members. An individual who is part of an active group has the ability to turn off notifications for the app; users will still receive the message, but will not be notified about it. Each group is given a label and assigned a unique number. Some of the features of the app include the ability to share photos, videos, locations, create events, and emojis from various packs.

GroupMe has a web client as well as apps for iOS, Android, Windows Phone, and Windows 10. GroupMe messages can be received and sent through SMS (available only in the United States). Users begin by creating a “group” and adding contacts. When someone sends a message, everyone in the group can see and respond to it. The app allows users to attach and send pictures, documents, videos, and web links. Users can also send private messages, but only to users who are also active on the GroupMe app.

== See also ==
- Comparison of cross-platform instant messaging clients
- Comparison of instant messaging protocols
- Comparison of Internet Relay Chat clients
- Comparison of LAN messengers
- Comparison of VoIP software
- List of SIP software
- List of video telecommunication services and product brands
