= NBC Education Nation =

Media program about education reform (2010-2013)

Education Nation was an initiative run by NBC News to promote discussion about the state of education in the United States. The initiative was launched in 2010 and held annual summits up to 2013. In 2014, the general manager of Education Nation announced that they would no longer host events and were "shifting from the policy debate to a more consumer-oriented approach."

== Events ==
Education Nation summits were multiple day events consisting of panel discussions on education issues and student and teacher town halls. The summit invited education reformers, politicians, and celebrities as guests. Education Nation 2010 held a town hall on the documentary Waiting for "Superman". Education Nation 2011 held a teachers town hall in which teachers were invited to discuss their experiences, as well as a panel discussion with state governors, hosted by Brian Williams, which discussed issues such as teacher evaluation and No Child Left Behind.

Education Nation has held competitions for education technology, providing funding to winners. Education technology companies NoRedInk and CodeHS have each won prizes of $75,000.

Notable guests have included Bill Clinton, Melinda Gates, Arne Duncan, and Goldie Hawn.

== Criticism ==
Education Nation has received criticism for promoting certain views on education, particular with respect to charter schools. Education Nation 2010's promotion of Waiting for "Superman" was criticized due to the documentary promoting charter schools and criticizing teachers' unions. Andrew Tyndall of the Tyndall Report also criticized the event for reflecting the views of the Gates Foundation, which was a sponsor of the event.

The summit has also been criticized for its choice of participants and sponsors. University of Phoenix, a private for-profit university, sponsored Education Nation 2010; the university had been subject to controversies concerning student withdrawal and undelivered promises of work eligibility. Education historian Diane Ravitch declined to attend Education Nation 2013, citing the lack of prominent opponents of corporate models of education. Education blogger Jeff Bryant criticized the 2013 event for inviting Goldman Sachs CEO Lloyd Blankfein.
