= Tynker =

Educational programming platform

Tynker IDE

- Screenshot of Tynker web IDE, editing a project
- Developer: Tynker
- Type: Educational Programming Language
- Website: tynker.com

Tynker is an educational programming platform, similar to Scratch, to help children learn coding skills, including game design, web design, animation and robotics. It includes courses in Minecraft Modding, Minecraft Game Design, Creative Coding, Python and CSS.

Tynker is based on HTML5 and JavaScript, and can be used in browsers, or on tablet computers or smartphones.

== History ==
The Tynker company was founded by Krishna Vedati, Srinivas Mandyam and Kelvin Chong in 2012 in Mountain View, California, United States with funds raised from angel and institutional investors. Tynker for Schools was launched in April 2013, with Tynker for Home the year after. 60 million students, in 90,000 schools, have used Tynker.

In 2018, Tynker partnered with Mattel to produce branded coding experiences with Hot Wheels and Monster High. It also has partnerships with Apple, Google, Sylvan Learning, BBC Learning, Infosys Foundation USA, Microsoft, PBS and Lego.

In September 2021, Tynker was acquired by Byju's, an Indian multinational educational technology in order to expand in foreign market.

On January 25, 2024, lenders began bankruptcy proceedings against Tynker's parent company Byju's in an effort to repay its loans. On February 1, 2024, Byju's U.S. division filed for Chapter 11 bankruptcy in Delaware. Byju's would raise around $200 million in an effort to clear "immediate liabilities" and for other operational costs. In 2025, CodeHS acquired Tynker in a bankrupcty court auction for $2.2 million.

== Mobile Applications ==
In July 2014 Tynker was released for iPad and Android. The projects can be accessed from both the web and the tablet and used on either platform.
