= Codecademy =

Online code-learning platform

- Homepage on July 13, 2018
- Company type: Subsidiary
- Founded: 2011
- Headquarters: New York City, United States
- Area served: Worldwide
- Founders: Zach Sims, Ryan Bubinski
- Industry: Internet
- Employees: 109
- Parent: Skillsoft
- Website: www.codecademy.com
- Commercial: Yes
- Registration: Yes
- Users: 45 million (April 2020)
- Current status: Up

Codecademy is an American online interactive platform that offers free coding classes in 13 different programming languages including Python, Java, Go, JavaScript, Ruby, SQL, C++, C#, Lua, and Swift, as well as markup languages HTML and CSS. The site also offers a paid "Pro" option that gives users access to personalized learning plans, quizzes, and realistic projects.

== History ==
Codecademy was founded in August 2011 by Zach Sims and Ryan Bubinski. Sims dropped out of Columbia University to focus on launching a venture, and Bubinski graduated from Columbia in 2011. The company, headquartered in New York City, raised $2.5 million in Series A funding in October 2011 and $10 million in Series B funding in June 2012. The latest round of funding was led by Index Ventures.

In August 2015, Codecademy partnered with the White House, working to host in-person meet-ups for 600 students from disadvantaged women and minority groups over a twelve-month period.

By August 2017, Codecademy's CEO Zach Sims officially announced the launch of the new paid "Pro" product. A "Pro Intensive" paid offering was also launched in August 2017 but as of 2020 this product appears to no longer be offered.

In December 2021, Skillsoft announced that it would acquire Codecademy for approximately $525 million in cash and stock. The sale was closed on April 5, 2022.

=== Partnerships ===
In August 2017, Codecademy partnered with Amazon for free Alexa skills training.

By October 2018, the company employed 85 people, up from 45 in 2016. It had also raised $42.5 million from groups such as Union Square Ventures and Naspers.

By January 2020, Codecademy had expanded to a suite of languages including C++, C#, Go, Java, JavaScript, Ruby, PHP, Python, R, Swift, and SQL, as well as various libraries, frameworks, and associated subjects. According to their roadmap, Codecademy is slated to release Android Development, ASP.NET, Flask, Kotlin, and TypeScript courses in 2019.

== Features ==
The platform also provides courses for learning command line and Git. In September 2015, Codecademy, in partnership with Periscope, added a series of courses designed to teach SQL, the predominant programming language for database queries. In October 2015, Codecademy created a new course, a class on Java programming. As of January 2014, the site had over 24 million users who had completed over 100 million exercises. The site has received positive reviews from The New York Times and TechCrunch.

As part of the Computer Science Education Week held in December 2013, Codecademy launched its first iOS app called "Hour of Code". The app focuses on the basics of programming, including the same content from the website.

In April 2019, Codecademy partnered with Adafruit for a course on electronics and hardware programming.

In December 2019, Codecademy launched a new course on Swift, a language developed by Apple Inc. for iOS, watchOS, macOS, tvOS, and more.

== Codecademy Pro ==
On August 3, 2017, Codecademy Pro was released. It has three levels:

1. Codecademy Pro
2. Codecademy Pro Intensive
3. Codecademy Pro Mentors

Codecademy Pro costs $39.99 per month, or annually at $239.88 per year ($19.99 per month).

== Code Year ==
Code Year was a free incentive Codecademy program intended to help people follow through on a New Year's Resolution to learn how to program, by introducing a new course for every week in 2012. Over 450,000 people took courses in 2012, and Codecademy continued the program into 2013. Even though the course is still available, the program has stopped.

== Awards ==
- Best Education Startup, Crunchies Awards 2012
- Skillies Technology Award 2015

== See also ==
- Code.org
- CodeCombat
- CodeHS
- Coursera
- edX
- freeCodeCamp
- Khan Academy
- LinkedIn Learning
- Replit
- SwitchUp
- Udacity
- Treehouse (company)
