= Richard E. Pattis =

- Occupation: Professor
- Awards: ACM Distinguished Member

Richard Eric Pattis is an American professor emeritus at the University of California, Irvine's Donald Bren School of Information and Computer Sciences, where he taught introductory programming and data structures.

He is the author of the Karel programming language, and published Karel the Robot: A gentle introduction to the art of programming.

Pattis has been a professor of computer science at Carnegie Mellon University and the University of Washington. He holds a master's degree from Stanford University.

He has moved back to Pittsburgh where he is a special faculty member at Carnegie Mellon University, advising CS undergraduates.

In 2011, he was elected an ACM Distinguished Member.
