= RUR-PLE =

Educational tool to help students learn the Python programming language

(RUR-PLE) - RUR - Python Learning Environment
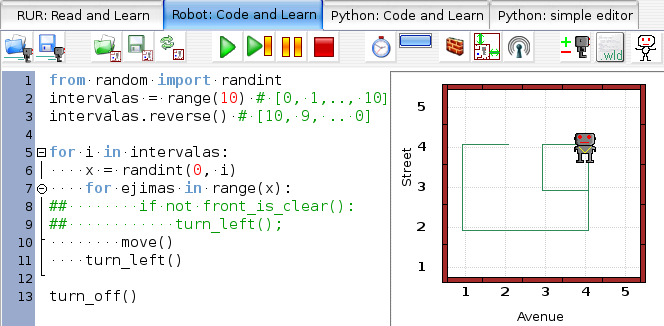
- RUR-PLE in action
- Initial release: December 12, 2004; 21 years ago
- Stable release: 1.0.1 / December 29, 2009; 16 years ago
- Written in: Python
- Operating system: Cross-platform
- Available in: Python
- Type: Educational programming language
- License: GNU General Public License
- Website: code.google.com/p/rur-ple

RUR - Python Learning Environment (RUR-PLE) is an educational tool to help students learn the Python programming language. Made by André Roberge. RUR-PLE uses the idea behind Karel the Robot, making the learning of Python programming more interesting. A student writes a program that controls a 'robot' that moves through a city consisting of a rectangular grid of streets (left-right) and avenues (up-down).

It is very similar to Guido van Robot (GvR), but RUR-PLE can use all Python features (while GvR only limited subset of syntax). RUR-PLE has 48 lessons (in main European languages and Chinese) with the code and robot environment examples to experiment with.

A second implementation of RUR-PLE, Rurple NG is in progress.
