= CodeCombat =

2013 educational video game

- Developer: CodeCombat Inc
- Engine: HTML5
- Platform: Web
- Release: 2013
- Genre: Educational

CodeCombat is an educational video game for learning software programming concepts and languages. This game is recommended for students ages 9–16. Students learn to type coding languages like JavaScript, Python, HTML and CoffeeScript, as well as learning the fundamentals of computer science. CodeCombat has 11 units - three game development units, two web development units, and six computer science units. The first unit, Computer Science 1, is free to all students and teachers. In 2019, CodeCombat was recognized by the College Board as an endorsed provider of curriculum and professional development for AP Computer Science Principles (AP CSP).

CodeCombat works directly with schools and districts, as well as offering self-paced learners a monthly paid subscription that gives access to additional game content. In order to advance through the game's levels, players must prove their knowledge by writing code. It includes both single-player and multi-player components, and is ideally suited for 4th-12th graders. The game was positively reviewed by PC Magazine, won the 2017 SIIA CODiE award for Best Creativity Tool for Students, and has been named a top pick for learning by Common Sense Education.

In January 2014, CodeCombat made their software open-source, and released a level editor so that users could create their own game content. In August 2019, CodeCombat released its newest game, Ozaria.

== Company ==
CodeCombat was founded in February 2013 by George Saines, Scott Erickson, Matt Lott, and Nick Winter, who had previously developed the language-learning application Skritter. The company is based in San Francisco, California and makes two programming games, Ozaria and CodeCombat, for schools and learners. In 2014, the company received $2 million in seed stage funding from firms such as Y Combinator, Andreessen Horowitz, and Allen & Company. In 2019, the company received $6M in Series A funding, led by Hone Capital. It announced a partnership with the Chinese internet company, NetEase, on April 18, 2018.
