= Treehouse (company) =

For-profit education company

Treehouse Island, Inc.
- Company type: Private
- Available in: English
- Founded: March 22, 2011; 15 years ago
- Headquarters: Portland, Oregon, {{{location_country}}}
- Area served: Worldwide
- Founders: Ryan Carson, Gillian Carson
- Industry: Internet
- Services: Technology education
- Employees: 5
- Website: Teamtreehouse
- Commercial: Yes
- Users: 50K+
- Current status: Active

Treehouse or (Team Treehouse) is an online technology school that offers beginner to advanced courses in web design, web development, mobile development, AI, and game development. Its courses are aimed at beginners looking to learn computer coding skills for a career in the tech industry.

The Treehouse learning program includes videos combined with interactive quizzes and code challenges. Treehouse Tracks are guided curricula, comprising courses that train students in large topic areas. Treehouse for Teams is designed to assist businesses, organizations, schools, and community programs in technology training. Since 2011, companies including Simple and LivingSocial used Treehouse to recruit new employees based on their progress and achievements on Treehouse.

== History ==
Ryan and Gillian Carson founded Treehouse in 2011, a project that emerged from Carson's previous company, Carsonified, and its video-tutorial service Think Vitamin Membership. Carson redesigned and rebranded the service as Treehouse because the name "reflects the wonder of learning as a child." In 2011, Treehouse opened their first office in Orlando, Florida, In 2012 they opened their second office and moved Treehouse HQ to Portland, Oregon.

In April 2012, Treehouse raised $4.75M in funding. In April 2013, Treehouse closed a US$7 million Series-B fundraising round led by Social+Capital and Kaplan bringing its total raised capital to $12.6 million.

In July 2013, Treehouse released its first iPad app for accessing Treehouse's content. Treehouse also released an Android application in 2014 and added a course for Apple's Swift programming language. At the time, Carson was the current CEO of Treehouse.

In May 2016, Treehouse announced the launch of the Techdegree Program. The Techdegree program is a guided learning program that is designed to help students prepare for entry-level development jobs. There are currently Techdegree programs available in Front End Web Development, Full Stack JavaScript, User Experience (UX) Design, PHP, and Python Development

In September 2019 Treehouse launched "Project: Unlock the American Dream" in Portland, in partnership with AnitaB.org, The Boys & Girls Clubs of America, and musician Aminé. The project aimed to train and place young adults into paid internships with technology firms, with the potential to turn into permanent jobs.

== Controversy ==
Carson has faced criticism in the past from employees and community members accusing him, a white man, of profiting off DEI efforts and of blocking individuals on social media who have questioned his motives, including prominent diversity advocate Stephen Green.

In September 2021, Carson drew the ire of Treehouse students and community partners by laying off 90% of Treehouse's staff without severance pay via a five-sentence message to Slack, despite expanding the company over the first half of 2021 and launching new initiatives such as the Ubora scholarship program. Employees who remained were told Treehouse would no longer cover their health insurance.

== Acquisition ==
In December, 2021 Treehouse was acquired by Xenon Partners, an owner/operator of enterprise SaaS businesses. Founder Ryan Carson departed the company in conjunction with the acquisition, with Jason Gilmore assuming the role of CEO. In the months following the acquisition, Treehouse significantly boosted the staff size and resumed work on several educational and student job placement initiatives.

=== Leadership ===
In January 2024, Kari Brooks assumed the role of Treehouse CEO, succeeding Jason Gilmore, who transitioned to the role of Xenon Partner.

== See also ==
- E-learning (theory)
- Technology integration
