= Higher Education Loan Authority of the State of Missouri =

U.S. student loan servicer

- Type: Quasi-governmental
- Industry: Student loans
- Founded: June 15, 1981
- Headquarters: Chesterfield, Missouri, U.S.
- Owner: State government of Missouri
- Number of employees: 625 (2013)
- Website: www.mohela.com

The Higher Education Loan Authority of the State of Missouri, also known as the Missouri Higher Education Loan Authority or MOHELA, is one of the largest holders and servicers of student loans in the United States. Its headquarters are in Chesterfield, Missouri, a suburb of St. Louis, Missouri.

Created in 1981 as a quasi-governmental entity, MOHELA participated in the Federal Family Education Loan Program (FFELP) for nearly three decades, where it oversaw loans guaranteed by the federal government. Following the abolition of the FFELP program in 2010, MOHELA began to expand its business, overseeing around 6.7 million student loan borrower accounts as of 2022.

== History ==
=== Early history (1981–2019) ===
MOHELA was founded by the Missouri General Assembly in 1981 to oversee loans guaranteed by the U.S. federal government through the Federal Family Education Loan Program. Following the program's abolition in 2010, MOHELA began to expand its presence in the student loan servicing industry. In 2011, it was granted a contract with the Department of Education (ED) to service over 100,000 federal student loans in 2011.

=== Operations during loan forbearance period (2020–2023) ===
As part of the U.S. federal government's response to the COVID-19 pandemic, the Federal Student Aid (FSA) office initiated a temporary pause on student loan payments alongside a 0% interest rate. In June 2020, ED announced that MOHELA was one of five servicers that would help oversee the federal student loan portfolio in order to bring “enhanced customer support”.

In 2021, it was reported that some FedLoan (Pennsylvania Higher Education Assistance Agency) student servicing loans were transferred to MOHELA. MOHELA became the sole servicer for the Public Service Loan Forgiveness (PSLF) program in July 2022, following the decision of FedLoan to break its ties with the Department of Education.

By August 2022, MOHELA was responsible for overseeing some 6.7 million student borrower accounts on ED's behalf, along with around 330,000 private loan borrowers. This increased to over 7.5 million borrowers by August 2023. As of December 2022, MOHELA has a 1.01 star rating from the Better Business Bureau.

=== Operations following resumption of loan payments (2023–present) ===
Following the resumption of student loan payments in October 2023, MOHELA was fined by ED for failing to send billing statements to student loan borrowers on time. In 2023, The Guardian reported that MOHELA "stands out among servicers for late bills and incorrect auto-debits."

In February 2023, the American Federation of Teachers and Student Borrower Protection Center released a report showing that 4 in 10 borrowers were affected by "servicing failures," including internal guidance described as a “call deflection scheme.” In July 2024, AFT filed a federal lawsuit in which the user experience of MOHELA's operations were described as "Kafkaesque."

In September 2026, MOHELA announced that it would move headquarters from Chesterfield to nearby O'Fallon, Missouri.

== Controversies ==
MOHELA has been subject to criticism from student borrowers regarding the MOHELA's handling of their loans that were transferred under its purview. The Washington Post noted that student borrower complaints against MOHELA spiked from 2021 to 2022: The Consumer Financial Protection Bureau (CFPB) went from receiving seven official complaints regarding MOHELA in the last quarter of 2021, to receiving over 500 complaints in the last three months of 2022 over MOHELA's loan servicing practices.

Student borrowers' complaints against MOHELA include:

- Charges for late payments due to delayed processing of those made to the Department of Education (DOE) before the transfer
- Failure to process borrowers' forms
- Suspension of auto-payment programs
- Changes to borrower's selected repayment plan and unwanted forbearances and deferments
- Increased payment amounts
- Lengthened estimated repayment-dates
- Applied or capitalized interest

=== Criticism surrounding administration of Public Student Loan Forgiveness program ===
In December 2022, The Washington Post reported that "thousands of borrowers have lodged complaints with the Education Department" in the previous three months over MOHELA's administration of the Public Service Loan Forgiveness (PSLF) program. Under the program, eligible public servants, including social workers and teachers, are able to have their debt cancelled after 10 years of service and 120 loan payments made on-time. Student loan borrowers eligible for PSLF relief have filed suit against MOHELA, accusing the servicer of delaying the cancellation of their debt and forcing them to make additional payments.

=== Role in student loan forgiveness lawsuit ===
Whether the state of Missouri could sue on behalf of MOHELA, which itself declined to get involved in the lawsuit, to block U.S. President Biden's student loan forgiveness executive order was one of the main issues in the Supreme Court case on the matter.

MOHELA was accused of being involved in six state attorneys' general lawsuit against the loan forgiveness program, which MOHELA executives denied. The Supreme Court ultimately decided that it could sue on behalf of MOHELA in Biden v. Nebraska, citing Arkansas v. Texas (1953) and Lebron v. National Railroad Passenger Corp. (1995)

== Legal issues ==
=== October 2023 $7.2 million Fine by U.S. Department of Education ===
In October 2023, the Department of Education announced it would penalize MOHELA for failing to send billing statements on time to 2.5 million student borrowers, whose payments resumed that month following a forbearance period that begun in 2020. As a result, ED announced it would withhold over $7.2 million from MOHELA's October payment, and ordered MOHELA to give all impacted student borrowers forbearance.

=== January 2024 Public Service Loan Forgiveness (PSLF) Class Action Lawsuit ===
In December 2023, a pair of student borrowers filed suit against MOHELA for its alleged mismanagement of the Public Service Loan Forgiveness (PSLF) program. The plaintiffs claimed that after becoming candidates for the program in August 2022, MOHELA did not respond to their requests, leading them to submit the request a year later. According to the plaintiffs, MOHELA nonetheless requested that the borrowers resume payments to their PSLF-eligible loans.

In January 2023, Sauder Schelkopf filed a class action lawsuit against the Department of Education and MOHELA. Plaintiffs Spencer Morgan, Francis Novak and Rowena Koenig claim that, despite servicing the PSLF program for more than a year before student loan payments resumed on Sept. 1, 2023, MOHELA has failed to process and render decisions on pending PSLF applications in a timely manner.

=== 2024 American Federation of Teachers (AFT) lawsuit ===
In July 2024, the American Federation of Teachers (AFT) filed a lawsuit against MOHELA. The lawsuit accusing the company of mismanaging eight million student borrowers' accounts and preventing borrowers from making their payments and receiving debt relief. Following the suit, Senate Majority Leader Chuck Schumer and Senators Bernie Sanders and Elizabeth Warren called for ED to scrutinize MOHELA's practices.

== Types of student loans owned or serviced by MOHELA ==
MOHELA services student loans, including:

- Federal subsidized and unsubsidized Stafford loans
- Subsidized and unsubsidized Federal Direct loans
- Federal Perkins loans, a need-based student loan
- PLUS loans, which are part of the Federal Direct Student Loan Program
- Federal GradPLUS loans
- Federal student loan consolidation

=== Number of student loans serviced ===
In a letter to members of the U.S. Senate, MOHELA stated that it serviced 2,464,028 student loan borrowers on February 1, 2020. This number increased to 7,773,939 by August 3, 2023.
