= Student loans in the United States =

Loans incurred to pay for higher education

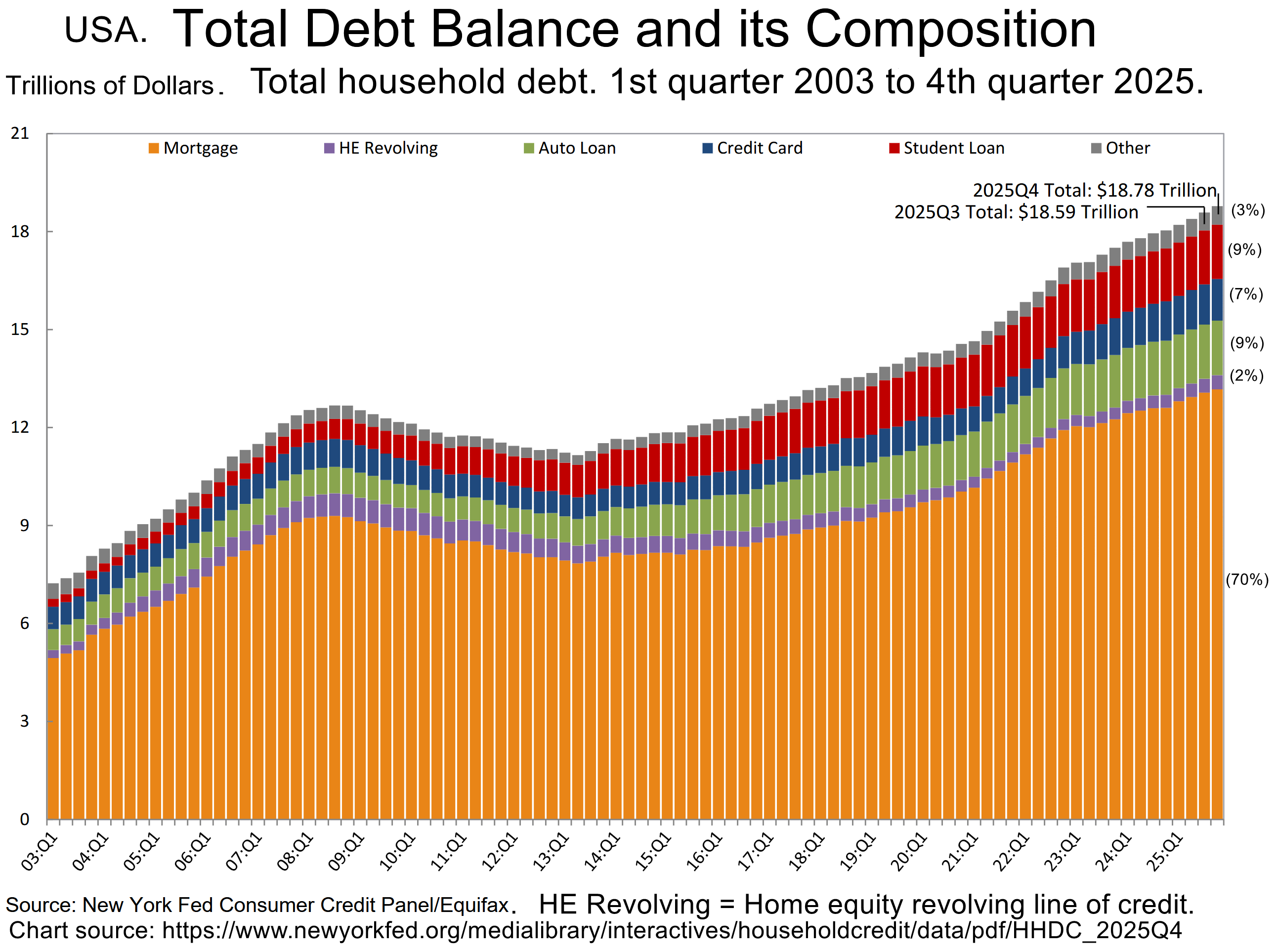
Total US household debt by type over time. Student loan debt in red.

In the United States, student loans are a form of financial aid intended to help students access higher education. In 2018, 70 percent of higher education graduates had used loans to cover some or all of their expenses. With notable exceptions, student loans must be repaid, in contrast to other forms of financial aid such as scholarships and bursaries which are not repaid, and grants, which rarely have to be repaid. Student loans may be discharged through bankruptcy, but this is difficult. Research shows that access to student loans increases credit-constrained students' degree completion and later-life earnings while having no impact on overall debt.

At the end of the second quarter of federal fiscal year 2026, on March 31, the federal student loan portfolio included $1.7239 trillion in outstanding principal and interest for 42.6 million unduplicated recipients. In 2019, students who borrowed to complete a bachelor's degree had about $30,000 of debt upon graduation. Almost half of all loans are for graduate school, typically in much higher amounts. Loan amounts vary widely based on race, social class, age, institution type, and degree sought. As of 2017, student debt constituted the largest non-mortgage liability for US households. Research indicates that increasing borrowing limits drives tuition increases.

Student loan defaults are disproportionately common in the for-profit college sector. Around 2010, about 10 percent of college students attended for-profit colleges, but almost 40 percent of all defaults on federal student loans were to for-profit attendees. The schools whose students have the highest amount of debt are University of Phoenix, Walden University, Nova Southeastern University, Capella University, and Strayer University. Except for Nova Southeastern, they are all for-profit. In 2018, the National Center for Education Statistics reported that the 12-year student loan default rate for for-profit colleges was 52 percent.

The default rate for borrowers who do not complete their degree is three times the rate for those who did. A Brookings Institution study in 2023 revealed that when the government pauses repayment on student loans, it "...benefit[s] affluent borrowers the most..." because high-income borrowers hold the largest student debt balances.

== History ==
Federal student loans were first offered in 1958 under the National Defense Education Act (NDEA). They were available only to select categories of students, such as those studying engineering, science, or education. The program was established in response to the Soviet Union's launch of the Sputnik satellite. It addressed the widespread perception that the United States had fallen behind in science and technology. Student loans became more broadly available in the 1960s under the Higher Education Act of 1965, with the goal of encouraging greater social mobility and equal opportunity.

In 1967, the publicly owned Bank of North Dakota made the first federally-insured student loan.

The US first major government loan program was the Student Loan Marketing Association (Sallie Mae), formed in 1973.

Before 2010, federal loans included:

- loans originated and funded directly by the Department of Education (ED)
- government guaranteed loans originated and funded by private investors.

Direct-to-consumer private loans were the fastest-growing segment of education finance. The "percentage of undergraduates obtaining private loans from 2003–04 to 2007–08 rose from 5 percent to 14 percent" and was under legislative scrutiny due to the lack of school certification.

=== 2010s ===
The rules for disability discharge underwent major changes as a result of the Higher Education Opportunity Act of 2008. The regulations took effect July 1, 2010. In June 2010, the amount of student loan debt held by Americans exceeded the amount of credit card debt held by Americans. At that time, student loan debt totalled at least $830 billion, of which approximately 80% was federal and 20% was private. By the fourth quarter of 2015, total outstanding student loans owned and securitized had surpassed $1.3 trillion.

Guaranteed loans were eliminated in 2010 through the Student Aid and Fiscal Responsibility Act and replaced with direct loans. The Obama administration claimed that guaranteed loans benefited private companies at taxpayer expense but did not reduce student costs.

The Health Care and Education Reconciliation Act of 2010 (HCERA) ended private-sector lending under the Federal Family Education Loan Program (FFELP) starting July 1, 2010; all subsidized and unsubsidized Stafford loans, PLUS loans, and Consolidation loans are under the Federal Direct Loan Program.

As of July 1, 2013, borrowers determined to be disabled by the Social Security Administration would be accepted for loan discharge if the SSA placed the individual on a five- to seven-year review cycle. As of January 1, 2018, the Tax Cuts and Jobs Act of 2017 established that debt discharged due to the death or disability of the borrower was no longer treated as taxable income.

In an effort to improve the student loan market, LendKey, SoFi (Social Finance, Inc.) and CommonBond began offering student loans and refinancing at lower rates than traditional lenders, using an alumni-funded model. According to a 2016 analysis by online student loan marketplace Credible, about 8 million borrowers could qualify for refinancing.

The Federal Reserve Bank of New York's February 2017 Quarterly Report on Household Debt and Credit reported 11.2% of aggregate student loan debt was 90 or more days delinquent.

On July 25, 2018, Education Secretary Betsy DeVos issued an order declaring that the Borrower Defense Program (enacted in November 2016), would be replaced with a stricter repayment policy, effective July 1, 2019. When a school closes for fraud before conferring degrees, students would have to prove that they were financially harmed. As of 2018, 10% of borrowers were in default after three years and 16 percent after five years.

In 2019, President Donald Trump ordered loan forgiveness for permanently disabled veterans, saving 25,000 veterans an average of $30,000 each. The same year, Theresa Sweet and other student loan debtors filed a claim against the US Department of Education, arguing that they had been defrauded by their colleges. The debtors filed under a rule known as Borrower Defense to Repayment.

=== 2020s ===
Starting in March 2020, federal student loan borrowers received temporary relief from student loan payments during the COVID-19 pandemic. This relief was subsequently extended multiple times, and expired at the end of June 2023. According to repayment data released by the Education Department, in December 2021, just 1.2 percent of borrowers were continuing to pay down their loans during the over two years of optional deferment.

In 2021, student loan servicers began dropping out of the federal student loan business, including FedLoan Servicing on July 8, Granite State Management and Resources on July 20, and Navient on September 28. According to Sallie Mae, as of 2021, 1 in 8 families are using private student loans when federal financing does not cover all college costs.

In July 2021, the U.S. Second Circuit Court of Appeals ruled that private student loans are dischargeable in bankruptcy, following two other cases.

In August 2021, the Biden administration announced it would use executive action to cancel $5.8 billion in student loans held by 323,000 people who are permanently disabled.

In November 2022, federal judge William Alsup ruled for immediate relief for about 200,000 student debtors and in April 2023 US Supreme Justice Elena Kagan declined to grant emergency relief to three for-profit colleges.

In the 30 years from 1991–1992 to 2021–2022, private college tuitions (adjusted for inflation) doubled, while public school tuitions increased by 2.5 times. In 1991–1992, state and local governments covered about three-quarters of the cost of public college, with tuition paying for the remaining quarter, but by 2021–2022, significant funding cuts to higher education resulted in governments only covering about half the current costs. In addition, since federal student loans do not limit the amount a lender can borrow, this has allowed public as well as private colleges to increase their tuitions.

In February 2023, the U.S. Supreme Court heard oral arguments in Biden v. Nebraska concerning President Biden's order to cancel student loan debt for an estimated 40 million debtors. In June 2023, the U.S. Supreme Court ruled in favor of Nebraska to block Biden's plan to forgive federal student loans.

In April 2025, Linda McMahon announced that the Department of Education would resume garnishment of the wages of student debtors whose loans are in default.

The second Trump administration restricted access to the Public Service Loan Forgiveness program while DHS announced it would offer "student loan forgiveness and repayment options" to Immigration and Customs Enforcement (ICE) recruits.

== Overview ==
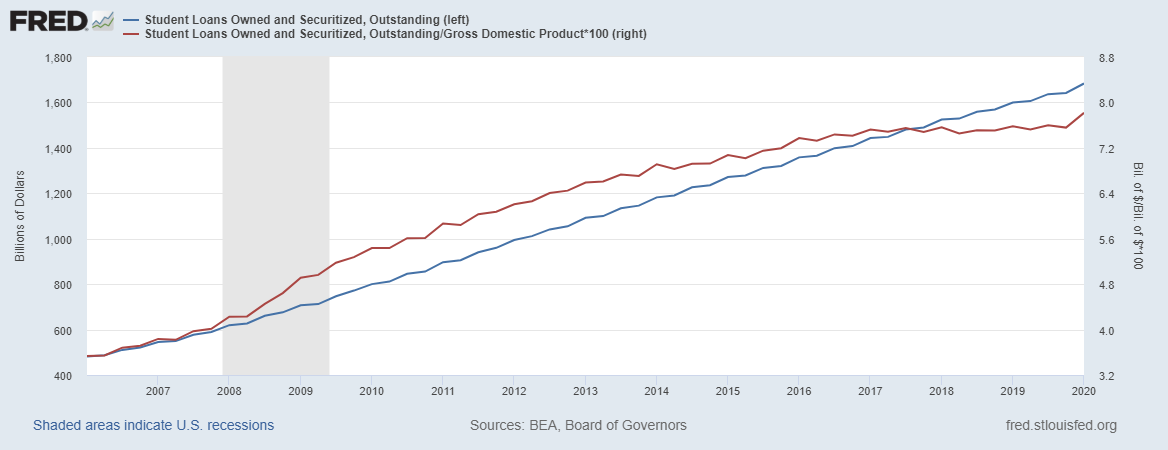
Student loan debt rose from $480.1 billion (3.5% GDP) in Q1 2006 to $1,683 billion (7.8% GDP) in Q1 2020.

Student loans play a significant role in U.S. higher education. Nearly 20 million Americans attend college each year, of whom close to 12 million – or 60% – borrow annually to help cover costs. As of 2021, approximately 45 million Americans held student debt, with an average balance of approximately $30,000.

In Europe, higher education receives more government funding, making student loans less common. In parts of Asia and Latin America government funding for post-secondary education is lower – usually limited to flagship universities, like the National Autonomous University of Mexico – and government programs under which students can borrow money are uncommon.

In the United States, college is funded by government grants, scholarships, loans. The primary grant program is Pell Grants.

Student loans come in several varieties, but are basically either federal loans or private student loans. Federal loans are either subsidized (the government pays the interest) or unsubsidized. Federal student loans are subsidized for undergraduates only. Subsidized loans generally defer payments and interest until some period (usually six months) after the student has left school. Some states have their own loan programs, as do some colleges. In almost all cases, these student loans have better conditions than private loans.

Student loans may be used for college-related expenses, including tuition, room and board, books, computers, and transportation.

== Demographics ==
Approximately 30% of all college students do not borrow. In 2019, the average undergraduate who had taken on debt had a loan balance of about $30,000 upon graduation. Almost half of the student loans are for graduate education, and those loan amounts are typically much higher.

=== Social class ===
According to the Saint Louis Federal Reserve Bank, "existing racial wealth disparities and soaring higher education costs may replicate racial wealth disparities across generations by driving racial disparities in student loan debt load and repayment."

Low-income students often prefer grants and scholarships over loans because of their difficulty repaying them. In 2004, 88.5% of Pell Grant recipients who had bachelor's degrees graduated with student loan debt. After college, students struggle to break into a higher income bracket because of the loans they owe. Though, it's been shown that when it comes to student loan forgiveness and advocacy around this issue, lower-socioeconomic groups are the ones most motivated to contact their legislators about student loans. In 1995, 64 percent of students whose family incomes falling below $35,000 were contacting their legislators concerning student loans.

=== Race and gender ===
According to The New York Times, "recent black graduates of four-year colleges owe, on average, $7,400 more than their white peers. Four years after graduation, they still owe an average of $53,000, almost twice as much as whites."

According to an analysis by Demos, 12 years after entering college:

- White men paid off 44 percent of their student-loan balance
- White women paid off 28 percent
- Black men saw their balances grow 11 percent
- Black women saw their loan balances grow 13 percent

=== Age ===
According to a CNBC analysis, the highest student debt balances are carried by adults aged 25–49, with the lowest debt loads held by those aged 62 and older.

As of 2021, approximately 7.8 million Americans from 18 to 25 carry student loan debt, with an average balance of almost $15,000. For adults between the ages of 35 and 49, the average individual balance owed exceeded $42,000. The average debt for adults between 50 and 61 is slightly lower. These balances include loans for their education and their children.

== Federal loans ==
=== Loans to students ===
Stafford and Perkins loans were federal loans made to students. These loans did not consider credit history (most students have no credit history); approval was automatic if the student met program requirements. Nearly all students are eligible to receive federal loans.

==== Payment and discharge ====
The student makes no payments while enrolled at least half-time. If a student drops below half time or graduates, a six-month deferment begins. If the student returns to least half-time status, the loans are again deferred, but a second episode no longer qualifies and repayment must begin. All Perkins loans and some undergraduate Stafford loans are subsidized. Loan amounts are limited.

Many deferment and forbearance options are offered in the Federal Direct Student Loan program.

Disabled borrowers have the possibility of discharge. Other discharge provisions are available for teachers in specific critical subjects or in a school that has more than 30% of its students on reduced-price lunch. They qualify for discharge of Stafford, Perkins, and Federal Family Education Loan Program loans up to $77,500.

Any person employed full-time by a 501(c)(3) non-profit group, or another qualifying public service organization, or serving in a full-time AmeriCorps or Peace Corps position, qualifies for discharge after 120 qualifying payments. However, loan discharge is considered taxable income. Loans discharged that were not the result of long-term public service employment constitute taxable income.

Student loan borrowers may have their existing federal student loan debt removed if they can prove that their school misled them. The program is called Borrower Defense to Repayment or Borrower Defense.

Subsidies are conditional depending on financial need. Pricing and loan limits are determined by Congress. Undergraduates typically receive lower interest rates, while graduate students typically can borrow more. Disregarding risk has been criticized as contributing to inefficiency. Financial needs may vary from school to school. The government covers interest charges while the student is in college. For example, those who borrow $10,000 during college owe $10,000 upon graduation.

==== Terms ====
Loans are guaranteed by DOE, either directly or through guarantee agencies.

The dependent undergraduate limits are $5,500 per year for freshman undergraduates, $6,500 for sophomore undergraduates, and $7,500 per year for junior and senior undergraduates, as well as students enrolled in teacher certification or coursework preparatory for graduate programs.

For independent undergraduates, the limits are $9,500 per year for freshmen, $10,500 for sophomores, and $12,500 per year for juniors and seniors, as well as students enrolled in teacher certification or preparatory coursework for graduate programs.

Unsubsidized loans are also guaranteed, but interest accrues during study. Nearly all students are eligible for these loans regardless of financial need. Those who borrow $10,000 during college owe $10,000 plus interest upon graduation. Accrued interest is added to the loan amount, and the borrower makes payments on the total. Students can make payments while studying.

Graduate students have higher limits: $8,500 for subsidized Stafford and $12,500 (varying by course of study) for unsubsidized Stafford. For graduate students, the Perkins limit is $6,000 per year.

==== Stafford loan aggregate limits ====
Stafford borrowers cannot exceed aggregate limits for subsidized and unsubsidized loans. For dependent undergraduates, the aggregate limit is $31,000, and the aggregate limit for independent undergraduates (or dependent undergraduates whose parents are unable to obtain PLUS Loans) is $57,500. Subsidized loans are limited to $23,000 in either case. Students who reach the maximum in subsidized loans may (based on grade level—undergraduate, graduate/professional, etc.) add a loan of less than or equal to the amount they would have been eligible for in subsidized loans. Once aggregate limits are met, the student is ineligible for additional Stafford loans until they pay back a portion of the borrowed funds. A student who has paid back some of these amounts regains eligibility up to the aggregate limits as before. Graduate students have a lifetime aggregate loan limit of $138,500.

==== Debt statistics ====
- Direct loans ($1.15 trillion, 34.2 million borrowers)
- FFEL loans ($281.8 billion, 13.5 million borrowers). The program ended in 2010.
- Perkins loans ($7.1 billion, 2.3 million borrowers). The program ended in 2018.
- Total ($1.4392 trillion, 42.9 million borrowers)

=== Loans to parents ===
PLUS Loans are federal education loans made to parents. These have much higher loan limits, usually enough to cover costs that exceed student financial aid. Payments start immediately after education ends, although prepayment is allowed. Credit history is considered; thus, approval is not automatic.

Interest accrues during the time the student is in school. PLUS interest rates as of 2017 were 7%.

The parents are personally responsible for repayment. The parents sign the master promissory note and are accountable. Parents are advised to consider their monthly payments. Loan documents reflect the repayment schedule for a single year. Since most students borrow again each year, the ultimate payments are much higher. PLUS loans consider credit history, making it more difficult for low-income parents to qualify.

Graduate students are eligible to receive PLUS loans in their own names. Graduate PLUS loans have the same interest rates and terms as those to parents.

Federal Direct Student Loans, also known as Direct Loans or FDLP loans, originate with the United States Treasury. FDLP loans are distributed by the DOE, then to the college or university and then to the student.

=== Debt levels ===
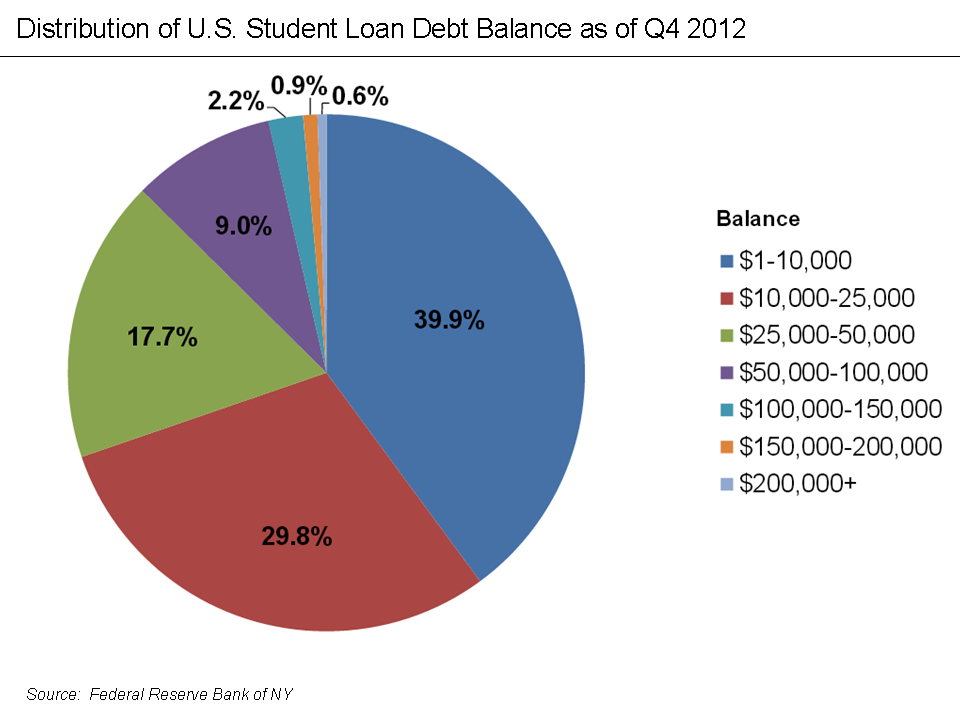
Distribution of student loan debt in the U.S.

Loan limits are below the cost of most four-year private institutions and most public universities. Students add private student loans to make up the difference.

The maximum amount that any student can borrow is adjusted as federal policies change.

=== Defaults ===
Out of 100 students who ever attended a for-profit institution, 23 defaulted in the 1996 cohort compared to 43 in the 2004 cohort (compared to an increase from 8 to 11 among borrowers who never attended a for-profit).

As of 2018 black BA graduates defaulted at five times the rate of white BA graduates (21 versus 4 percent), and were more likely to default than white dropouts.

== Private loans ==
Private loans are offered by banks or finance companies. They are not guaranteed by a government agency. Private loans cost more, offer less favorable terms, and are generally used only when students have exhausted the federal borrowing limit. They are not eligible for Income-Based Repayment plans, and frequently have less flexible payment terms, higher fees, and more penalties, than federal student loans. Private loans may be difficult to discharge through bankruptcy.

Private loans are made to students or parents. They have higher limits and no payments until after education, although interest starts to accrue immediately and the deferred interest is added to the principal. Interest rates are higher on federal loans, which are set by the United States Congress.

The advantage of private student loans is that they do not include loan or total debt limits. They typically offer a no-payment grace period of six months (occasionally 12 months).

Most experts recommend private loans only as a last resort, because of the less favorable terms.

== Loan servicers ==
The U.S. Department of Education contracts with companies to manage, or service, the loans it owns. These companies are the primary point of contact for borrowers after they graduate and enter repayment.

A student loan servicer is a company which facilitates different aspects of a loan. The servicing group will typically be responsible for maintaining records on a particular loan, handling loan distribution, and providing requested information to the loan recipient. US student loan servicers include Navient, FedLoan Servicing (PHEAA), MOHELA, HESC/EdFinancial, Granite State - GSMR, OSLA Servicing, and Debt Management and Collections System.

In recent years, some student loan servicers have gone under legal scrutiny for alleged wrongdoing. Navient, formerly Sallie Mae, was charged with multiple class action lawsuits for their loan servicing methods. Navient was also sued by the Consumer Financial Protection Bureau (CFPB) for improper handling of borrower relations. FedLoan has also received public pressure for possible mistreatment of loan recipients.

As of July 2023, the four companies which service the majority of student loans are Aidvantage, EdFinancial Services, MOHELA (Higher Education Loan Authority of the State of Missouri) and Nelnet. ECSI (Educational Computer Systems, Inc.) is the exclusive servicer for the remaining Perkins Loans. Borrowers who have defaulted on loans are assigned to the Department of Education's Default Resolution Group for servicing.

== Student loan asset-backed securities (SLABS) ==
FFELP and private loans are bundled, securitized, rated, then sold to institutional investors as student loan asset-backed securities (SLABS). Navient and Nelnet are two major private lenders. Wells Fargo Bank, JP MorganChase, Goldman Sachs and other large banks package and sell SLABS in bundles. Moody's, Fitch Ratings, and Standard and Poor's rate SLAB quality.

The Asset-Backed Security (ABS) industry received financial relief in 2008 and in 2020 through the Term Asset-Backed Securities Loan Facility (TALF) program, which was created to preserve the flow of credit to consumers and businesses, including student loans. In 2020, critics argued that the SLAB market was poorly regulated and could be headed toward a significant downturn, despite perceptions that it was low risk.

== Repayment and default ==
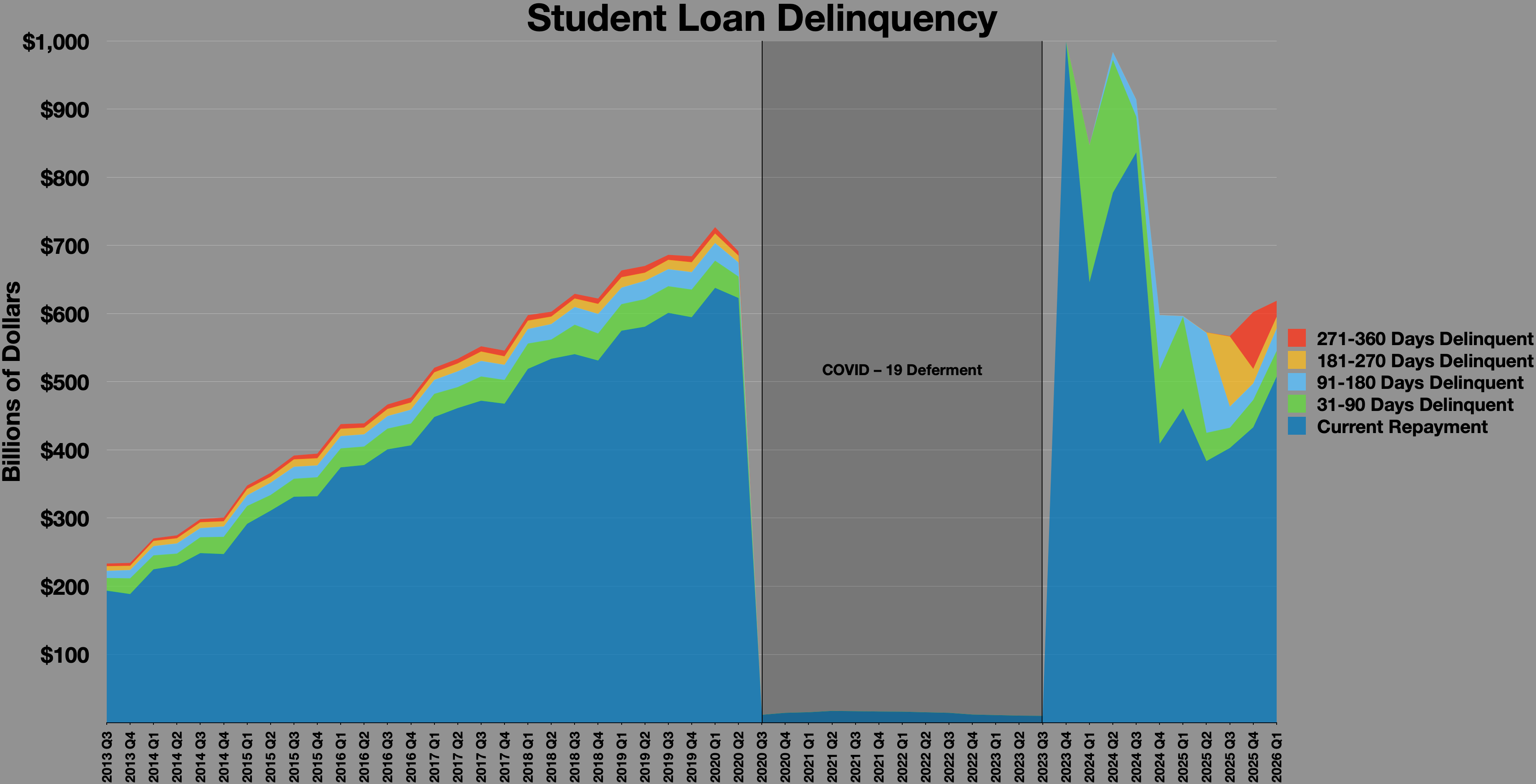
Student loan delinquency

Defaulting on a loan happens when repayments are not made for a certain period of time as defined in the loan's terms of agreement, typically a promissory note. For federal student loans, default requires non-payment for a period of 270 days. For private student loans, default generally occurs after 120 days of non-payment.

As of 2025, outstanding federal student loan debt exceeded $1.6 trillion.

=== Metrics ===
The industry metrics are repayment rate and default rate, such as the one-, three-, five-, and seven-year default rates. DOE's College Scorecard includes the following repayment statuses:

- Making Progress
- Forbearance
- Deferment
- Not Making Progress
- Delinquent
- Defaulted
- Paid In Full
- Discharged

==== Repayment rate ====
The three-year repayment rate for each school that receives Title IV funding is available at DOE's College Scorecard. This number may be a poor indicator of the overall default rate: some schools place loans into forbearance, deferring loans beyond the three-year window to present a low default rate.

==== Default rate ====
The default rate for borrowers who did not complete their degree is three times as high as the rate for those who did.

According to analysis of borrowers from the 2003–2004 academic year over a twelve-year period, defaulters generally tend to be older, lower income, and more financially independent than those who did not default. Borrowers typically owe $9,625, which is $8,500 less than the median loan balance of a non-defaulter. The majority of defaulters did not complete their bachelor's degree, but the median completed at least one year of study while maintaining grades in the C+/B- range. This shows that defaulters are able to complete college level work. Furthermore, most borrowers do not immediately enter default - the median borrower takes 33 months to enter default on their federal loans. Generally, a little more than half of all defaulters are able to rehabilitate their debt.

=== Standard repayment ===
Federal loans are initially designated as standard repayment. Standard repayment borrowers have 10 years to repay. The loan servicer calculates the monthly payment amount that will pay off the original loan amount plus all accrued interest after 120 equal payments.

Payments cover interest and part of the principal. Some loan terms may be shorter than 10 years. The minimum monthly payment varies in amount, but is usually within the range of $50–100.

=== Income-related repayment ===
==== Income-based repayment ====
Income-based repayment options in the United States consist four plans:

Four IDRs are available:

- Income-Based Repayment (IBR)
- Pay As You Earn (PAYE)
- Saving on a Valuable Education (SAVE), which replaced Revised Pay As You Earn (REPAYE) in 2023
- Income-Contingent Repayment (ICR)

These plans limit monthly payments to a percentage of discretionary income and forgive unpaid balances after a certain number of years.

==== Income share agreements ====
An income share agreement is an alternative to a traditional loan. The borrower agrees to pay a percentage of their salary to the educational institution after graduation. Purdue University offers income share agreements.

=== Defenses to repayment ===
Under some circumstances, debt can be cancelled. For example, students who attended a school when it closed or the student was enrolled based on false claims may be able to escape repayment.

=== Leaving the country to evade repayment ===
Debt evasion is the intentional act of trying to avoid attempts by creditors to collect a debt. News accounts report that some individuals are departing the US to escape their debt. Emigration does not discharge the loan or stop interest and penalties from accruing.

International addresses make it more difficult to find people, and collection companies would usually need to hire an international counsel or a third party collector to recoup the debt, cutting into their profits and reducing their incentive to go after a debtor. "It increases our expenses to go overseas," says Justin Berg of American Profit Recovery, a debt collection agency in Massachusetts. "Our revenues are cut by more than half," he says.

Nations may enter into agreements with the US to facilitate the collection of student loans.

After default, co-signers remain liable for repayment.

== Bankruptcy ==
Federal loans and some private loans can be discharged in bankruptcy by demonstrating that the loan does not meet the requirements of section 523(a)(8) of the bankruptcy code or by showing that repayment of the loan would constitute "undue hardship". While credit card debt often can be discharged through bankruptcy proceedings, this option is not generally available for federally subsidize or insured student loans. Unless the loan can be proven not to be an educational benefit, those seeking to discharge their debt must initiate an adversary proceeding, a separate lawsuit within the bankruptcy case where they illustrate the required hardship. Many borrowers cannot afford the costs to retain an attorney or litigation costs associated with an adversary proceeding, such as a bankruptcy case. The undue hardship standard varies from jurisdiction to jurisdiction, but is generally difficult to meet. In most circuit courts discharge depends on meeting the three prongs in the Brunner test:

As noted by the district court, there is very little appellate authority on the definition of "undue hardship" in the context of 11 U.S.C. § 523(a)(8)(B). Based on legislative history and the decisions of other district and bankruptcy courts, the district court adopted a standard for "undue hardship" requiring a three-part showing: (1) that the debtor cannot maintain, based on current income and expenses, a "minimal" standard of living for herself and her dependents if forced to repay the loans; (2) that additional circumstances exist indicating that this state of affairs is likely to persist for a significant portion of the repayment period of the student loans; and (3) that the debtor has made good faith efforts to repay the loans. For the reasons set forth in the district court's order, we adopt this analysis. The first part of this test has been applied frequently as the minimum necessary to establish "undue hardship." See, e.g., Bryant v. Pennsylvania Higher Educ. Assistance Agency (In re Bryant), 72 B.R. 913, 915 (Bankr.E.D.Pa.1987); North Dakota State Bd. of Higher Educ. v. Frech (In re Frech), 62 B.R. 235 (Bankr.D.Minn.1986); Marion v. Pennsylvania Higher Educ. Assistance Agency (In re Marion), 61 B.R. 815 (Bankr.W.D.Pa.1986). Requiring such a showing comports with common sense as well.

Federal student loans may be eligible for administrative discharge. Those provisions do not apply to private loans, although private loans may be subject to discharge in bankruptcy. One study found that a quarter million student debtors file for bankruptcy each year. Approximately 450 attempted to seek a discharge in 2017 by arguing that their loan was not an "educational benefit" as defined by section 523(a)(8), or they successfully argued for "undue hardship". Of the completed cases, more than 60% were able to discharge their debts or achieve a settlement. The study concluded that the data showed:

Creditors are settling unfavorable cases to avoid adverse precedent and litigating good cases to cultivate favorable precedent. Ultimately, this litigation strategy has distorted the law and cultivated the myth of nondischargeability.

The study found that debtors who obtain favorable outcomes do not possess unique characteristics differentiating them from those who do not seek discharge and estimates that 64,000 individuals who filed for bankruptcy in 2019 would have met the hardship standard. It concluded about half of all bankrupt debtors could obtain relief, except that they had become convinced that loans were not dischargeable.

For disabled debtors the standard is whether "substantial gainful activity" (SGA) is still possible Borrowers determined to be disabled by the Social Security Administration, are eligible if the SSA placed the individual on a five- to seven-year review cycle. Debt discharged due to death or total permanent disability is nontaxable.

In three circuit court jurisdictions private student loans are dischargeable in bankruptcy.

== Criticisms ==
=== School effects ===
Some critics of financial aid in general claim that it allows schools to raise their fees, to accept unprepared students, and to produce too many graduates in some fields of study.

In 1987, then-Secretary of Education William Bennett argued that "... increases in financial aid in recent years have enabled colleges and universities blithely to raise tuition, confident that Federal loan subsidies would help cushion the increase." This statement came to be known as the "Bennett Hypothesis".

In July 2015, a Federal Reserve Bank of New York Staff Report concluded that institutions more exposed to increases in student loan program maximums tended to respond with disproportionate tuition increases. Pell Grant, subsidized, and unsubsidized loans led to increases of about 40, 60, and 15 cents on the dollar, respectively. In the 20 years between 1987 and 2007, tuition costs rose 326%. Public universities increased their fees by 27% over the five years ending in 2012, or 20% adjusted for inflation. Public university students paid an average of almost $8,400 annually for in-state tuition, while out-of-state students paid more than $19,000. For the two decades ending in 2013, college costs rose 1.6% more than inflation each year. By contrast, government funding per student fell 27% between 2007 and 2012.

Many students cannot get loans or determine that the cost of going to school is not worth the debt, believing that they would still be unable to make enough income to pay it back.

Some universities steered borrowers to preferred lenders that charged higher interest rates. Some of these lenders allegedly paid kick backs to university financial aid staff. After the behavior became public, many universities rebated fees to affected borrowers.

=== Interest rates ===
The federal student loan program was criticized for not adjusting interest rates according to factors under students' control, such as the choice of academic major. Critics have contended that flat-rate pricing contributes to inefficiency and misallocation of resources in higher education and lower productivity in the labor market. However, one study found that high debt and default levels do not burden society substantially.

=== Bankruptcy ===
In 2009 student loans' non-dischargeability was claimed to provide a credit risk-free loan for the lender, averaging 7 percent a year.

=== Long-term debt and default ===
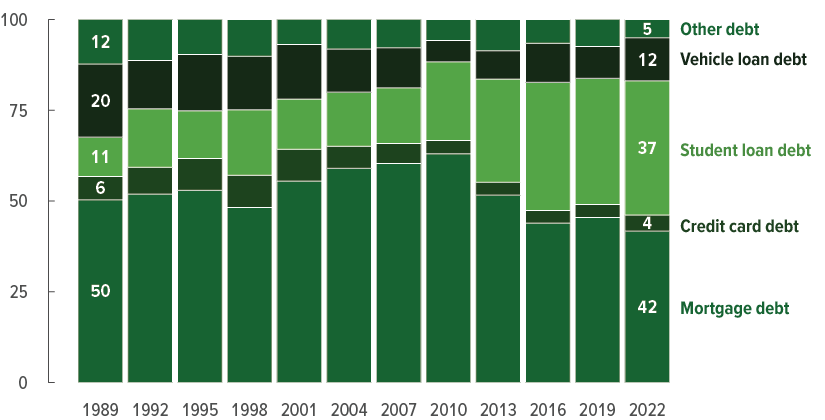
Increasing student loan percent of total household debt. For people in the bottom 25% by wealth. As the borrower pool under the more difficult bankruptcy rules has increased so has the percent of total debt for those poorer borrowers least able to pay all debts.

About one-third of borrowers never pay off their loans. Those who default shift their burden to taxpayers.

According to Harvard Business School researchers, "when student debt is erased, a huge burden is lifted and people take big steps to improve their lives: They seek higher-paying careers in new states, improve their education, get their other finances in order, and make more substantial contributions to the economy."

A June 2023 report by the Jain Family Institute concluded that much of the outstanding 1.8 trillion in student loan debt will never be repaid, as more and more borrowers are unable to repay, and the cancelling of a large portion of outstanding student debt will be inevitable. The increased necessity of higher education to attain employment means more and more people are forced to take out loans. Stagnating wages, rising tuition, and the shrinking of government funding for higher education result in more and more borrowers being unable to repay and are forced to carry that debt burden well into the future, "impairing economic well-being for a widening and diversifying swath of the population, inhibiting savings, increasing precarity, and draining the very incomes the student debt was supposed to increase." The report says that, unless something changes, future generations will suffer the same consequences of student loan debt as millennials have, including "delayed marriages, reduced childbearing, less entrepreneurship, and decreased retirement security, among others."

=== Sallie Mae and Nelnet ===
Sallie Mae and Nelnet are the largest lenders and are frequently defendants in lawsuits. The False Claims Suit was filed on behalf of the federal government by former DOE researcher Dr. Jon Oberg against Sallie Mae, Nelnet, and other lenders. Oberg argued that the lenders overcharged the United States Government and defrauded taxpayers of over $22 million. In August 2010, Nelnet settled and paid $55 million. Ultimately seven lenders returned taxpayer funds as a result of his lawsuits.

=== School quality ===
In April 2019, Brookings Institution fellow Adam Looney, a long-time analyst of student loans, claimed that:

It is an outrage that the federal government offers loans to students at low-quality institutions even when we know those schools don't boost their earnings and that those borrowers won't be able to repay their loans. It is an outrage that we make parent PLUS loans to the poorest families when we know they almost surely will default and have their wages and social security benefits garnished and their tax refunds confiscated, as $2.8 billion was in 2017. It is an outrage that we saddled several million students with loans to enroll in untested online programs that seem to have offered no labor market value. It is an outrage that our lending programs encourage schools like USC to charge $107,484 (and students to blithely enroll) for a master's degree in social work (220 percent more than the equivalent course at UCLA) in a field where the median wage is $47,980. It's no wonder many borrowers feel their student loans led to economic catastrophe.

=== Potential consequences of student loan debt ===
While college grads earn about 70% more than people with only a high school degree, student loan debt has been associated with several social, economic, and psychological consequences, including:

- having to choose less satisfying work that pays more
- lower credit ratings from missed payments that may disqualify borrowers from work opportunities given poor payment history
- reduced wealth accumulation
- reduced housing access
- delayed marriage
- delayed childbirth
- decreased retirement security
- increased anxiety

== Reform proposals ==
Organizations that advocate for student loan reform include the Debt Collective and Student Loan Justice.

Some pundits proposed that colleges share liability on defaulted student loans.

Sen. Bernie Sanders (I-Vt.) and Rep. Pramila Jayapal (D-Wash.) introduced legislation in 2017 to "make public colleges and universities tuition-free for working families and to significantly reduce student debt." The policy would eliminate undergraduate tuition and fees at public colleges and universities, lower interest rates, and allow those with existing debt to refinance. Sanders offered a new proposal in 2019 that would cancel $1.6 trillion of student loan, undergraduate and graduate debt for around 45 million Americans.

Senator Brian Schatz (D-Hawaii) reintroduced the Debt Free College Act in 2019.

In 2020, a majority of economists surveyed by the Initiative on Global Markets felt that forgiving all student loans would be more beneficial to higher income earners than lower income earners.

During the 2020 presidential election, then-candidate Joe Biden said he planned to allow $10,000 in debt forgiveness to all student debtors. On August 24, 2022, Biden announced that he would forgive an amount of $10,000 for an estimated 43 million borrowers, and an additional $10,000 for Pell Grant recipients, with this relief limited to singles earning under $125,000 and married couples earning under $250,000, including refunding payments during the forbearance period by any borrower who requests it. This would reduce debt for an estimated 43 million borrowers and eliminate student loan debt for an estimated 20 million. The Congressional Budget Office estimated that it would cost the government about $400 billion. The administration also proposed a new income-driven repayment plan. The U.S. Supreme Court ruled June 30, 2023 in Biden v. Nebraska that Biden's plan required action by Congress and that the Higher Education Relief Opportunities For Students Act did not permit the administration to act on its own.

Some borrowers still have loans issued under the Federal Family Education Loan Program which closed in 2010. The Biden forgiveness plan originally allowed these borrowers to receive forgiveness by consolidating into Direct Loans, but due to potential lawsuits stopped allowing this on September 29, 2022, potentially excluding 800,000 FFEL borrowers.

In February 2024, the Biden administration announced it would cancel $1.2 billion of student debt. The debt cancellation applies only to those enrolled in the Saving on a Valuable Education (SAVE) repayment plan who have been making payments for at least 10 years and who originally borrowed $12,000 or less for school. In April 2024, Biden announced plans to ease student loan debt, benefiting 23 million Americans. The plans included cancellation of up to $20,000 of accrued interest, regardless of income and automatic cancellation of debt for borrowers who were eligible for certain forgiveness programs, who had entered repayment decades ago, who had enrolled in low financial value programs, or who had been experiencing hardship.

== See also ==
- Student financial aid in the United States
- College tuition in the United States
- EdFund
- Free education
- Higher Education Price Index
- Tertiary education
- Private university
- Student debt
- Student loan
- Tuition payments
- Tuition freeze
