= National Student Loan Data System =

The National Student Loan Data System (NSLDS) is the U.S. Department of Education’s (ED) central database for Federal Student Aid. NSLDS receives data from schools, guaranty agencies, the Direct Loan program, and other ED programs. NSLDS Student Access provides a centralized, integrated view of Title IV loans and grants so that recipients of Title IV Aid can access and inquire about their Title IV loans and/or grant data.

== Source of information ==
The loans and grants listed on the NSLDS website have been reported from different sources. In general, the agency that authorized the aid award is responsible for reporting aid information to NSLDS. Direct Loans are reported by a Direct Loan servicer, Federal Family Education Loan Program loans are reported by their guarantor, Perkins loans are reported by schools (or their agent), and grants are reported by the U.S. Department of Education's Common Origination and Disbursement System.

Loan servicers can typically provide more current balance and loan status information than the information provided in the database, which may be out of date or incorrect.
