= Michigan Guaranty Agency =

Government organization

The Michigan Guaranty Agency (MGA) is a component of the Michigan Higher Education Assistance Authority (MHEAA) and was established by Michigan Public Act 77 of 1960. MGA operates guarantees for three loan programs which are intended to guarantee subsidized and unsubsidized Federal Stafford loans, Federal PLUS loans, and Federal Consolidation loans made by banks, credit unions, savings and loan associations, insurance companies, certain federal agencies, and by the Michigan Higher Education Student Loan Authority (MHESLA).

The purpose of MHEAA's loan programs is to make low-interest, long-term educational loans available to students attending participating postsecondary institutions, and their parents. The loans are intended to enhance educational opportunities and improve the chance of success for program participants.
