= Private student loan (United States) =

Higher education financing option

A private student loan is a financing option for higher education in the United States that can supplement, but should not replace, federal loans, such as Stafford loans, Perkins loans and PLUS loans. Private loans, which are heavily advertised, do not have the forbearance and deferral options available with federal loans (which are never advertised). In contrast with federal subsidized loans, interest accrues while the student is in college, even if repayment does not begin until after graduation. While unsubsidized federal loans do have interest charges while the student is studying, private student loan rates are usually higher, sometimes much higher. Fees vary greatly, and legal cases have reported collection charges reaching 50% of amount of the loan. Since 2011, most private student loans are offered with zero fees, effectively rolling the fees into the interest rates.

Interest rates and loan terms are set by the financial institution that underwrites the loan, typically based on the perceived risk that the borrower may be delinquent or in default of payments of the loan. Most lenders assign interest rates based on 4-6 tiers of credit scores. The underwriting decision is complicated by the fact that students often do not have a credit history that would indicate creditworthiness. As a result, interest rates may vary considerably across lenders, and some loans have variable interest rates. More than 90% of private student loans to undergraduate students and more than 75% of private student loans to graduate students require a creditworthy cosigner.

Unlike other consumer loans, Congress made student loans, both federal and private, exempt from discharge (cancellation) in the event of a personal bankruptcy, except when repaying the student loan would represent an undue hardship on the borrower and the borrower's dependents. This is a serious restriction that students rarely understand when obtaining a student loan.

Financial aid, including loans, may not exceed the college's cost of attendance.

== Loan types ==
Private student loans generally come in two types: school-channel and direct-to-consumer.

School-channel loans offer borrowers lower interest rates, but generally take longer to process. These loans are "certified" by the school, which means the school signs off on the borrowing amount, and the funds are disbursed directly to the school. The "certification" means only that the school confirms the loan funds will be used for educational expenses only and agrees to hold them and disburse them as needed. Certification does not mean that the school approves of, recommends, or has even examined the loan terms.

Direct-to-consumer private loans do not involve the school. The student supplies enrollment verification to the lender, and the loan proceeds are disbursed directly to the student. While direct-to-consumer loans generally carry higher interest rates than school-channel loans, they allow families access to funds more quickly — in some cases, in a matter of days. This convenience comes at the risk of student over-borrowing and/or use of funds for inappropriate purposes.

Loan providers range from large education finance companies to speciality companies that focus exclusively on this niche.

== Interest rates ==
Private student loans usually have substantially higher interest rates, and the rates fluctuate depending on the financial markets. Some private loans require substantial up-front origination fees ("points") along with lower interest rates. Interest rates also vary depending on the applicant's credit history.

Most private loan programs are tied to financial indexes such as the Wall Street Journal Prime rate or the BBA LIBOR rate, plus an overhead charge. Students and families with excellent credit generally receive lower rates and smaller loan origination fees than those with poorer credit histories. Interest payments are tax deductible.

Lenders rarely give complete details of loan terms until after an application is submitted. Many lenders advertise only the lowest interest rate they charge (for good credit borrowers). Borrowers with damaged credit can expect interest rates that are as much as 6% higher, loan fees that are as much as 9% higher, and loan limits that are two-thirds lower than those advertised figures.

== Loan fees ==
Private loans often carry an origination fee, which can be substantial. Origination fees are a one-time charge based on the amount of the loan. They can be paid from the loan proceeds or from personal funds independent of the loan amount, often at the borrower's preference. Some lenders offer low-interest, 0-fee loans. The origination fee gets paid once, while interest is paid throughout the loan. The loan amount accumulates to about 15 billion borrowed from private loans.

All lenders are legally required to provide a statement of the annual percentage rate (APR) prior to closure. Unlike the "base" rate, this rate includes any fees charged and can be thought of as the "effective" interest rate including interest, fees, etc. When comparing loans, comparing APR rather than "rate" ensures a valid comparison for loans that have the same repayment term. However, if the repayment terms are different, APR becomes a less-perfect comparison tool. In those circumstances comparing total financing costs may be more appropriate.

== Loan terms ==
In contrast with federal loans, whose terms are standardized, private loan terms vary from loan to loan. However, it is not easy to compare them, as some conditions may not be revealed until signing. A common suggestion is to consider all terms, not just respond to advertised interest rates. Applying to multiple lenders (to create a comparison) can damage the borrower's credit score. Examples of other terms that vary by lender are deferments (amount of time after leaving school before payments start) and forbearances (a period when payments are temporarily stopped due to financial or other hardship).

== Cosigners ==
Private student loan programs generally issue loans based on the credit history of the applicant and any applicable cosigner, co-endorser or coborrower. Students may find that their families have too much income or too many assets to qualify for federal aid, but lack sufficient assets and income to pay for school without assistance. Most students need a cosigner in order to qualify for a private loan.

Many international students can obtain private loans (they are usually ineligible for federal loans) with a cosigner who is a citizen or permanent resident. However, some graduate programs (notably top MBA programs) partner with private loan providers. In those cases, no cosigner is needed for international students.

== Criticisms ==
After the passage of the bankruptcy reform bill of 2005, even private student loans are not discharged during bankruptcy. This provided a credit-risk-free loan for the lender, averaging 7 percent a year.

In 2007, the then-Attorney General of New York State, Andrew Cuomo, led an investigation into lending practices and anti-competitive relationships between student lenders and universities. Specifically, many universities steered student borrowers to "preferred lenders" which resulted in those borrowers incurring higher interest rates. Some of these "preferred lenders" allegedly rewarded university financial aid staff with "kickbacks." This has led to changes in lending policy at many major American universities. Many universities have also rebated millions of dollars in fees back to affected borrowers.

The biggest lenders, Sallie Mae and Nelnet, are criticized by borrowers. They frequently find themselves embroiled in lawsuits, the most serious of which was filed in 2007. The False Claims Suit was filed on behalf of the federal government by former Department of Education researcher, Dr. Jon Oberg, against Sallie Mae, Nelnet, and other lenders. Oberg argued that the lenders overcharged the U.S. Government and defrauded taxpayers of millions of dollars. In August 2010, Nelnet settled the lawsuit and paid $55 million.

Prior to 2009, most private student loans did not offer death and disability discharges. After the Boston Globe published an article critical of Sallie Mae's failure to discharge the private student loans of a Marine killed in action, Sallie Mae launched a new student loan program with death and disability discharges similar to those available on federal student loans. Since then, about half of private student loans offer death and disability discharges.

In 2011, The New York Times published an editorial endorsing the return of bankruptcy protections for private student loans in response to the economic downturn and universally increasing tuition at all colleges and graduate institutions.

A 2014 report from Consumer Financial Protection Bureau (CFPB), shows a rising problem with these types of loans. Borrowers face “auto-default” when cosigner dies or goes bankrupt. The report shows that some lenders demand immediate full repayment upon the death or bankruptcy of their loan cosigner, even when the loan is current and being paid on time.

== Participants ==
The biggest student loan lender, Sallie Mae, was formerly a government-sponsored entity, which became private between 1997 and 2004. A number of financial institutions offer private student loans, including banks like Wells Fargo, and specialized companies. There are also a number of state-affiliated, nonprofit student loan lenders, which account for approximately 10% of the private student loan market. This segment includes organizations such as VSAC and Higher Education Loan Authority of the State of Missouri, Student loan search and comparison websites allow visitors to evaluate loan terms from a variety of partner lenders, and financial aid offices in universities typically have a preferred vendor list, but borrowers are free to obtain loans wherever they can find the most favorable terms.

As the economy collapsed in 2008–2011, many players withdrew from the private student loan lending world. The remaining lenders tightened the credit criteria, making it more difficult to receive a loan. Most now require a credit-worthy cosigner. After the economic collapse of 2008, a number of peer-to-peer lending and alternative lending platforms emerged to help students find private student loans. For example, U.S. online marketplace lending platform LendKey allows consumers to book loans directly from community lenders like credit unions and community banks.
