= American Bar Association v. United States Department of Education =

2016 United States district court case

- Court: United States District Court for the District of Columbia
- Full case name: American Bar Association, et al. v. United States Department of Education, et al.
- Argued: September 26 2018
- Decided: February 22 2019

Court membership
- Judge sitting: Timothy J. Kelly

American Bar Association v. United States Department of Education, 370 F. Supp. 3d 1 (D.D.C. 2019), was a case filed in December 2016 in the United States District Court for the District of Columbia that reached its final resolution in February 2020, in which the ABA and four individual public interest lawyers (two of whom were former ABA employees) succeeded in preventing the United States Department of Education from denying individuals employed by certain "public service organizations" eligibility to participate in the Public Service Loan Forgiveness (PSLF) program. Following an initial victory on summary judgment for three of the individual plaintiffs in the district court's February 2019 ruling, the ABA and the fourth individual plaintiff settled the outstanding issues with the department. As a result, the four individual plaintiffs and all employees of the ABA, as well as other similarly situated individuals, are eligible to participate in the PSLF program.

== History ==
The PSLF program was signed into law by President George W. Bush in 2007 and provided that anyone working full-time in eligible public service jobs could have the remaining balance of their student loans issued under the Federal Direct Student Loan Program forgiven after making 120 qualifying monthly payments. In 2008, the Department of Education issued a regulation defining the term "public service job" to include any full-time position at an eligible "public service organization," including a federal, state, local, or Tribal government; a 501(c)(3) not-for-profit organization; and any other not-for-profit organization that provides any of a number of listed "public services," including "public interest law services" and "public education," among others. The ABA is a not-for-profit 501(c)(6) organization. Several ABA employees, including two who were individual plaintiffs in the case, worked on public interest law projects for the organization, such as assisting undocumented immigrants on the U.S. southern border and expanding access to justice for indigent individuals. After initially reviewing the Employment Certification Forms submitted by those employees, the Department of Education sent letters confirming that their ABA employment would qualify them for the PSLF program, provided that they continued to make monthly payments for the required 120-month period. Similarly, the remaining two individual plaintiffs, who worked for the not-for-profit 501(c)(6) American Immigration Lawyers Association (AILA) and not-for-profit 501(c)(19) Vietnam Veterans of America (VVA), provided public education services on issues related to immigration law and services to individuals with disabilities and the elderly (i.e., Vietnam War veterans), respectively; the department likewise informed them that their employment qualified them for participation in PSLF. A few years later, however, the department issued each of these individuals notices stating that their employment did not qualify for PSLF, that the prior approval notices had been issued in error, and that none of the payments made on their loans while employed by these organizations would count toward the 120-payment threshold.

Following unsuccessful attempts by the ABA to resolve its dispute with the department, the ABA and the four individual plaintiffs filed suit on December 20, 2016, seeking to force the department to reinstate the plaintiffs' PSLF eligibility. The plaintiffs alleged that the department had improperly changed its interpretations of the PSLF qualifying criteria as defined in the statute and regulation, in violation of the Administrative Procedure Act (APA) and the plaintiffs' due process rights under the Fifth Amendment. The department's primary arguments in defense were that the lawsuit was premature since none of the individuals in question had yet reached the 120-payment threshold that would allow them to apply for PSLF, and therefore that there had been no "final agency action" giving rise to an APA claim; and that the department had not changed its interpretations but instead had merely corrected errors committed by its student loan servicer, which was responsible for administering the PSLF program. The department also defended its denials by arguing that the ABA and the other organizations were not public service organizations because their "primary purpose" was not to provide one of the services listed in the regulation, and because AILA's public education services were not provided in a "school or school-like setting."

== Decision and outcome ==
In an opinion issued on February 22, 2019, Judge Timothy J. Kelly granted summary judgment in favor of three of the individual plaintiffs: the two former ABA employees and the AILA employee. Kelly rejected as "nonsense" the department's argument that its denials did not amount to final agency action, finding that the legal and practical effects of the department's denial notices were significant given the immense impact on the plaintiffs' ability to plan their careers and finances, even if they had not yet applied for final loan forgiveness. Kelly further determined that evidence produced by the plaintiffs demonstrated conclusively that the department had created the "primary purpose" and "school-like setting" standards years after issuing its 2008 regulation and without providing any of the public notice required under the APA, thus rendering the changes arbitrary and capricious. As a result, he issued an order vacating those standards and remanding the denial notices to the department for reconsideration in light of his opinion. Kelly denied summary judgment to the ABA as an organization and to the fourth individual plaintiff who had worked for VVA, finding that the evidence did not demonstrate that that plaintiff's denial had been based on a changed interpretation.

The ABA and the fourth individual plaintiff commenced an appeal in the United States Court of Appeals for the District of Columbia Circuit. For its part, the department declined to appeal the district court's ruling with respect to the three individual plaintiffs who had prevailed. Following a court-appointed mediation, the department agreed to issue letters confirming that both the ABA and VVA are qualifying public service organizations for purposes of the PSLF program, and restored the fourth individual plaintiff's payment credits earned while at VVA. Ropes & Gray LLP partner Chong Park, who represented the plaintiffs, noted the "positive impact this has for [the] individual plaintiffs as well as other student loan borrowers in similar positions." The practical effect of the outcome is that the department is barred from applying the "primary purpose" or "school-like setting" standards when assessing the PSLF eligibility of any non-501(c)(3) not-for-profit organization.
