= Grad PLUS =

American federal student loan

Graduate PLUS is a type of federal student aid, in the form of student loans, which is available to graduate and professional students. Similar to the Parent PLUS loan for parents of dependent undergraduate students, the Graduate PLUS loan is an unsubsidized federally guaranteed education loan with no annual or aggregate limits. It has no grace period and it goes into repayment as soon as the funds are disbursed to the borrower. It has the same deferment and forbearance options as the federal Stafford loan program. As such, graduate and professional students can postpone repayment using in-school deferment while enrolled at least half-time in a degree or certificate program of study.

At present, interest rates on Federal Family Education Loan Program (FFELP) Federal PLUS loans are fixed at 6.84%. Many lenders offer borrower benefits to reduce this interest rate during repayment. During any period of deferment or forbearance, interest can accrue and be capitalized to the principal loan balance at the end of the deferment or forbearance period if it is not paid by the borrower as it accrues. There is also a 4.272% origination fee attached to the loan that, due to regulations, cannot be paid by the lender on the borrower's behalf.

On July 1, 2026, the One Big Beautiful Bill Act (OBBBA) ended the graduate plus loan for new students starting a graduate program. There is an exception for students who are already enrolled in grad school to continue to receive grad plus loans up to three years or the remaining length of the program.

== Eligibility ==
Eligibility for PLUS loans require the applicant to

(1) be a U.S. citizen/national or eligible non-citizen with a valid Social Security number,
(2) pass a credit review and not have adverse credit history as defined by regulation (see credit criteria below), and
(3) not be in default on any federal education loan or owe a refund on a federal education grant.

To get a PLUS loan, the applicant cannot have adverse credit based on the review of at least one credit report from a national credit reporting agency. Lack of a credit history or insufficient credit history is not considered adverse credit. Applicants with adverse credit can provide an endorser (cosigner) who does not have adverse credit to get a PLUS loan.

The federal Graduate PLUS loan is a federally guaranteed loan and must be certified by one's school of attendance.
