= Federal student loan consolidation =

In the United States, the Federal Direct Student Loan Program (FDLP) includes consolidation loans that allow students to consolidate Stafford Loans, Graduate PLUS Loans, and Federal Perkins Loans into one single debt.

== Interest rates and payments ==
Consolidation loans have longer terms than other loans. Debtors can choose terms of 10–30 years. Although the monthly repayments are lower, the total amount paid over the term of the loan is higher than would be paid with other loans. The fixed interest rate is calculated as the weighted average of the interest rates of the loans being consolidated, assigning relative weights according to the amounts borrowed, rounded up to the nearest 0.125%, and capped at 8.25%. Some features of the original consolidated loans, such as postgraduation grace periods and special forgiveness circumstances, are not carried over into the consolidation loan, and consolidation loans are not universally suitable for all debtors.

== History ==
The Federal Loan Consolidation Program was created in 1986. In 1998, the United States Congress changed the interest rate to the aforementioned fixed rate weighted mean, effective February 1, 1999. Consolidation loans taken out before that date had a variable interest rate, determined by the individual FDLP loan origination center (e.g., in the case of a university, that university) or FFELP lender (e.g., a third party bank).

In 2005, the Government Accountability Office considered consolidating consolidation loans so that they were exclusively managed through the FDLP. Based on several assumptions about future variations in interest rates, the loan volume, the percentage of defaulters, cost estimates from the United States Department of Education, it concluded that while doing so would incur an additional cost of $46 million, caused by the higher administrative costs of the FDLP compared to the FFELP, this would be offset by a $3,100 million saving comprised in part of avoiding $2,500 million in subsidy costs. In 2008, turmoil in the financial and credit markets has led to the suspension of many loan consolidation programs, including Sallie Mae, Nelnet and Next Student.
