= Empower =

Empower may refer to:

- EMPOWER, a Thai organization supporting sex workers
- Empower (agency), a US advertising and marketing agency
- EmPower (aircraft power adapter), a standard for 15-volt direct current power outlets in passenger airplanes
- Empower (emergy), the flow of emergy (embodied energy)
- Empower (financial services), a US financial holding company

== See also ==
- Empower America, a conservative think tank in the United States
- Empower Orphans, a US non-profit organization
- Empower Playgrounds, a US company that designs playground systems
- Empowered (comics), an original English-language manga
- Empowerment
- MPower (disambiguation)
