= Seth Frotman =

American lawyer

Seth R. Frotman is an American lawyer who previously served as the general counsel of the Consumer Financial Protection Bureau. He founded the Student Borrower Protection Center in 2018.

== Education ==
Frotman earned a bachelor's degree from the University of Michigan from 1996 to 2000. He completed a J.D. at Indiana University Maurer School of Law 2001 and 2004.

== Career ==
After completing his legal education, Frotman worked as a clerk at the U.S. Court of Appeals for the Third Circuit from September 2004 to September 2005. He then served as assistant staff counsel in the New Jersey Senate from September 2005 to May 2006.

Between May and December 2006, Frotman was the research and policy director for Patrick Murphy's congressional campaign in Pennsylvania. Following the campaign, he worked for Murphy from January 2007 to January 2011 in various legislative roles, including legislative director and deputy chief of staff. From June 2010 to January 2011, he was detailed to the U.S. House Appropriations Committee as an assistant to Murphy.

In March 2011, Frotman joined the Consumer Financial Protection Bureau (CFPB) as a senior adviser in the Office of Servicemember Affairs, a position he held until February 2015. Between February 2015 and April 2016, he held multiple roles in the CFPB's Office for Students, serving as deputy assistant director, interim student loan ombudsman, and later assistant director from April 2016 to September 2018. During his tenure, the office handled over 50,000 student loan complaints and facilitated the return of more than $750 million to student loan borrowers.

In August 2018, Frotman resigned from his position at the CFPB, citing concerns that the agency's leadership had undermined its ability to protect student loan borrowers. He accused the CFPB's leadership of suppressing a report on bank fees imposed on college students and stated that consumer protection efforts had been deprioritized. Following his resignation, Frotman founded the Student Borrower Protection Center, an organization aimed at addressing student loan-related consumer protection issues.

Frotman re-joined the CFPB as general counsel and senior advisor under Director Rohit Chopra in 2021. In February 2025, he again announced his resignation.
