= MPower =

MPOWER, MPower, or mPower may refer to:

- MPOWER, a World Health Organization tobacco-control policy package
- BMW M, a subsidiary of BMW AG
- B&W mPower, a proposed modular nuclear reactor
- M-Power, a software development platform
- Mpower Financing, a student loans program
- O3b mPOWER, a medium Earth orbit satellite constellation by SES S.A.
- MPower (TV series), a television docuseries from Marvel Studios

== See also ==
- Empower (disambiguation)
