= Prospect College =

- Type: Vocational College
- Established: 1997
- Location: Washington, D.C., United States
- Website: prospectcollege.edu

Prospect College was a vocational college located in Washington, D.C. that offered programs in health and IT to residents of Washington, D.C., Maryland, and Virginia. Formerly named Technical Learning Centers, Prospect College was founded in 1997 as a non-degree post-secondary school and was licensed by the D.C. Licensure Commission. Prospect College's CEO at the time of closure was Mark Toufanian. Prospect College ceased operations on January 31, 2023.

== Programs ==
Programs offered included Medical Assistant, Medical Office Administration Medical Billing and Coding, IT, and PC Specialist. Students in the Medical Assistant, Medical Office Administration, and Medical Billing and Coding programs were required to complete a 170-hour externship.

== Locations ==
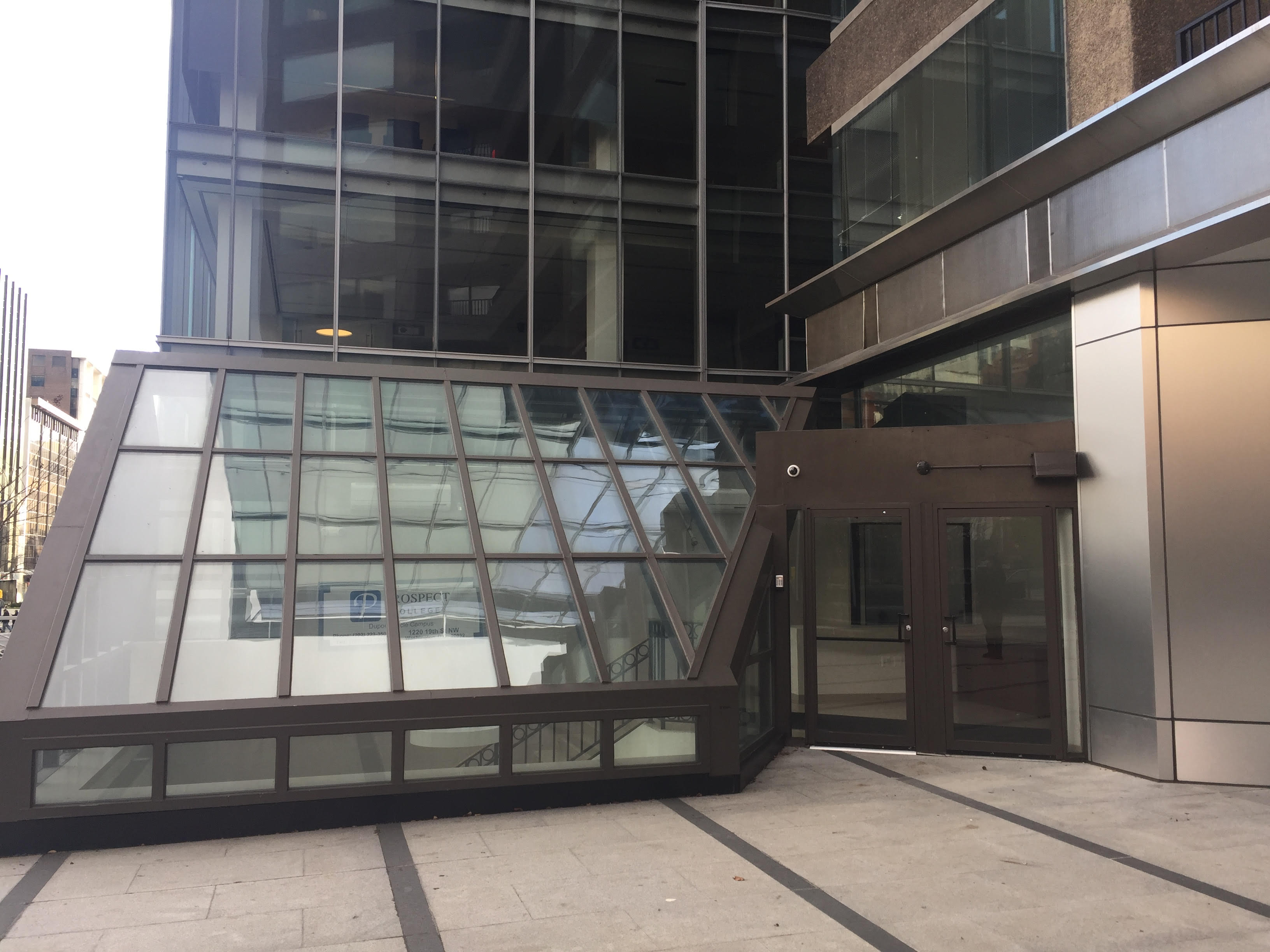
Prospect College's Dupont Extension Campus

The main campus was located at 1220 19th St NW Suite 100 Washington, D.C. 20006. The DuPont extension campus was located at 1220 19th St NW Suite LL Washington, D.C. 20006.

== Certifications ==
- Higher Education Licensure Commission
- Nationally Accredited by the Council on Occupational Education
- Certified to participate in Title IV Financial Aid programs by the U.S. Department of Education
- Authorized to accept student referrals from the Workforce Investment Act (WIA) and the D.C. Vocational Rehabilitation Agency
