= Student Borrower Protection Center =

American-based nonprofit organization

- Formation: 2018; 8 years ago
- Founders: Seth Frotman; Mike Pierce; Bonnie Latreille
- Type: Nonprofit organization
- Location: Sacramento, California, United States
- Executive director: Mike Pierce
- Website: protectborrowers.org

The Student Borrower Protection Center is an American nonprofit organization aimed at protecting borrowers of student loans and improving the student loan system.

== History ==
The Student Borrower Protection Center was founded in late 2018 by Seth Frotman, former student loan ombudsman at the Consumer Financial Protection Bureau; Mike Pierce, former lead higher education and consumer protection adviser at the bureau; and Bonnie Latreille, a former advisor to Frotman at the bureau. They formed the Student Borrower Protection Center to address what they perceived as the Trump administration’s favoritism toward the student loan industry with an aim of assisting student loan borrowers and reducing the growing amount of student debt held by Americans, stating that “the federal government hasn’t just walked away from the fight on behalf of borrowers, it is actually arming the other side.” The group also announced a partnership with the University of California, Irvine School of Law aimed at driving academic research on the effects of the student debt crisis.

In July 2021, the Biden administration announced that Latreille would serve as the U.S. Department of Education’s student loan ombudsman, its top watchdog for the federal student loan program. In October 2021, the Consumer Financial Protection Bureau announced that Frotman would return to the agency to serve as acting General Counsel. Mike Pierce became executive director following Frotman's return.

== Advocacy efforts ==
=== Income driven repayment ===
The Student Borrower Protection Center worked with the Student Debt Crisis Center, the Center for Responsible Lending, and the National Consumer Law Center to advocate for improvements to the income driven repayment plan system(IDR). The suggested improvements include retroactively counting time spent in the plan towards forgiveness, for relief to be granted automatically, and for the program to apply to all federal student loans. On April 19, 2022, Secretary of Education Miguel Cardona announced a new initiative modeled on this proposal, promising “[m]ore than 3.6 million borrowers will also receive at least three years of additional credit toward IDR forgiveness.”

=== Public Service Loan Forgiveness Program ===
In 2018, the group joined the American Federation of Teachers to launch an investigation into the failure of the Public Service Loan Forgiveness program. Over the course of three years, Student Borrower Protection Center supported litigation by teachers and uncovered evidence of government mismanagement and industry abuses across the student loan system, including evidence that Public Service Loan Forgiveness systematically failed to deliver debt relief to members of the military, as reported by Leslie Stahl on 60 Minutes. In October 2021, the Biden administration announced an overhaul of the embattled program, promising immediate debt cancellation to tens of thousands of public service workers and additional credit towards loan forgiveness for over half a million borrowers.

In 2022, the group released data regarding the Public Service Loan Forgiveness program stating that 9 million public servants are eligible for the loan forgiveness program, however, only 15% have filed paperwork related to the relief program and only 2% have received said relief. The group has also partnered with a coalition of labor unions representing public sector employees to raise awareness and enrollment in the Public Service Loan Forgiveness program.

=== Student loan debt relief ===
At the beginning of the COVID-19 pandemic, the center was a proponent for blanket relief for student loan borrowers, arguing that “lenders should immediately and automatically implement payment relief measures and protections against late fees, damaged credit, and other negative consequences for all delinquent borrowers across their entire loan portfolios.” From 2020 to 2022, the center issued multiple letters to President Biden, co-signed by hundreds of organizations, calling on the President to extend the pause on student loan payments that is currently set to expire August 31, 2022. The organizations advocate for the President to extend the pause until he follows through on his campaign promise to cancel student debt for all borrowers.

=== Educational redlining ===
In 2020, the center launched an investigation into a practice the group calls “educational redlining,” identifying cases where banks and financial firms charge people who attend Historically Black Colleges and Universities more money for student loans and other financial products compared to people who attend majority-white colleges. This investigation spurred the Senate Banking Committee to launch a probe into the practice. In 2021, the group joined NAACP Legal Defense Fund to enter into an agreement with Upstart Holdings, a company identified in the group's 2020 investigation. The settlement subjects Upstart's lending business to independent monitoring by civil rights law firm Relman Colfax.

=== Income share agreements ===
In 2020, the group filed a complaint with the Federal Trade Commission accusing income-share agreement servicer Vemo Education of engaging in deceptive marketing practices. Vemo was servicer of the now-suspended Purdue University Back a Boiler income share agreement program. The Student Borrower Protection Center was critical of the Back a Boiler program, sending a letter to the Department of Education and the Consumer Financial Protection Bureau accusing the university of violating the Higher Education Act.
