= Sallie Mae =

American student loan company

SLM Corporation
- Trade name: Sallie Mae
- Formerly: Student Loan Marketing Association
- Type: Public
- Traded as: Nasdaq: SLM; S&P 400 Component
- Industry: Financial services; Education
- Founded: June 23, 1972; 54 years ago
- Headquarters: Newark, Delaware, U.S.
- Key people: Jonathan Witter (CEO); Carter Franke (chair, Board of Directors); Kerri Palmer (COO); Pete Graham (CFO)
- Products: Private student loans; Credit cards; College planning tools; Retail banking
- Operating income: US$1.89 billion (2021)
- Net income: US$1.16 billion (2023)
- Total assets: US$20.4 billion (2023)
- Total equity: US$2.15 billion (2023)
- Website: salliemae.com

SLM Corporation (commonly known as Sallie Mae; originally the Student Loan Marketing Association) is a publicly traded U.S. corporation that provides consumer banking. Its nature has changed dramatically since it was set up in the early 1970s; initially a government entity that serviced federal education loans, it then became private and began offering private student loans.

The company's primary business is creating, servicing, and collecting private education loans. The company also provides online tools and resources for college planning. Sallie Mae previously originated federally guaranteed student loans under the Federal Family Education Loan Program (FFELP) and worked as a servicer and collector of federal student loans on behalf of the Department of Education. The company now offers private education loans and manages more than $12.97 billion in assets.

On April 30, 2014, Sallie Mae spun off its loan servicing operation and most of its loan portfolio into a separate, publicly traded entity called Navient Corporation. Navient is the largest servicer of federal student loans and acts as a collector on behalf of the Department of Education.

== History ==
The Student Loan Marketing Association was originally created in 1972 as a government-sponsored enterprise (GSE) and began privatizing its operations in 1997, a process it completed at the end of 2004 when Congress terminated its federal charter, ending its ties to the government. The company provides private education loans for students and their families. These loans are not made, insured, or guaranteed by any state or federal government.

In 1999, Sallie Mae acquired Nellie Mae Corporation for $320 million. Nellie Mae was originally established as the non-profit New England Education Loan Marketing Corporation in 1981 by the Massachusetts state government to serve as a secondary market buyer of federally-guaranteed student loans. Proceeds from Sallie Mae's purchase of Nellie Mae served to create an endowment for the Nellie Mae Education Foundation, which is no longer affiliated with Sallie Mae.

In 2005, Sallie Mae was among 53 entities that contributed the maximum of $250,000 to the second inauguration of President George W. Bush.

In August 2006, Sallie Mae acquired Upromise, a company that provides rebates to buyers of certain brands, which can be applied to college savings accounts. In May 2020, Upromise was acquired by loyalty marketing company Prodege.

On April 16, 2007, Sallie Mae announced that an investor group led by J.C. Flowers & Co. signed an agreement to purchase Sallie Mae for approximately $25 billion. Had the transaction been completed, J.C. Flowers, along with private-equity firm Friedman Fleischer & Lowe would have owned 50.2% of Sallie Mae, and Bank of America and JPMorgan Chase would each have owned 24.9%. Sallie Mae would have ceased to be a publicly traded company. The deal fell through in September 2007, with the buyers blaming adverse changes to the business's outlook as a result of the College Cost Reduction and Access Act of 2007 and the tightening of global credit markets following the 2007 subprime mortgage financial crisis. Sallie Mae subsequently began legal action, only to drop it in January 2008 upon completion of a $31 billion funding round, including funding from Bank of America.

In 2008, SLM was bailed out by the US government through a buy back of FFEL private loans.

On April 6, 2009, Sallie Mae announced that it would move 2,000 jobs back to the U.S. within the next 18 months as it shifts call center and other operations from overseas.

On March 31, 2010, Sallie Mae announced the impending layoff of 2,500 employees in response to the signing of new legislation calling for the federal government to lend directly to students, bypassing institutions like Sallie Mae.

On July 1, 2010, Sallie Mae announced that it would be moving its headquarters from Reston, Virginia, to its existing facility in Newark, Delaware.

On September 17, 2010, Sallie Mae acquired federally insured loans from Citigroup-owned Student Loan Corporation worth $28 billion.

SLM Corporation, the company that operates Sallie Mae, was formed in 2013. On February 25, 2014, Sallie Mae announced the launch of Navient, a separate entity for federal student loan servicing. On April 30, Sallie Mae legally separated from Navient, and made its primary focus private student loans, banking products, and credit cards for college students and their families.

In March 2020, the company announced Jonathan Witter, former Hilton executive, would replace Raymond Quinlan as the new CEO.

Sallie Mae announced a partnership with Mpower Financing in April 2021, to expand access to higher education for international and DACA students.

== Corporate information ==
The Sallie Mae corporate headquarters is in Newark, Delaware. Sallie Mae also operates offices in New Castle, Delaware; Newton, Massachusetts; Indianapolis, Indiana; Salt Lake City, Utah; and Sterling, Virginia.

=== Corporate board ===
Albert Lord held the positions of vice chairman and CEO until his retirement 2013. Lord joined Sallie Mae in 1981, took over as CEO in 1995, and led the company's privatization. On May 29, 2013, the board announced Jack Remondi as Lord's successor.

Carter Franke is the current chair of Sallie Mae's board of directors, since her appointment in June 2020. Prior to Franke, Raymond J. Quinlan served in the role, having joined the board in 2014 to replace previous chairman Anthony P. Terracciano—formerly president of First Union Corporation (now Wells Fargo). Quinlan was also the chief executive office of Sallie Mae from May 2014 until March 2020, when current CEO Jonathan Witter assumed the position.

== Awards ==
Through The Fund's work, Sallie Mae was named among BusinessWeek's Top 15 Corporate Philanthropists in 2004. The Washington Business Journal identified the company as the top local corporate philanthropist in 2005.

== Controversies ==
A 60 Minutes segment (originally aired May 7, 2006) examined Sallie Mae, including its business practices. Senator Elizabeth Warren, then a professor at Harvard Law School and sharp critic of what she characterizes as unfair lending practices, questioned Sallie Mae's dual role as lender and collector of student loans.

In February 2007, New York Attorney General Andrew Cuomo launched an investigation into alleged deceptive lending practices by student loan providers, including The College Board, EduCap, Nelnet, Citibank, and Sallie Mae. On April 11, 2007, Cuomo ended his investigation of Sallie Mae and announced that Sallie Mae had voluntarily agreed to change its lending standards to satisfy a new code of conduct for student loan practices established by Cuomo, and to donate $2 million (USD) to a fund devoted to educating college-bound students about their loan options.

On October 10, 2007, documents surfaced showing that Sallie Mae was attempting to use the Freedom of Information Act to force colleges to turn over students' personal information. The university involved, the State University of New York system, was expected to decline the request and be forced to defend its position in court.

In December 2007, a class action lawsuit was brought against Sallie Mae in a Connecticut federal court alleging that the company discriminated against African American and Hispanic private student loan applicants by charging them high interest rates and fees. The lawsuit also alleged that Sallie Mae failed to properly disclose private student loan terms to unsuspecting students. New York Attorney General Andrew Cuomo, raised similar concerns about possible student loan redlining in June 2007. The lawsuit was settled and dismissed in 2011. Under the terms of the settlement, Sallie Mae agreed to make a $500,000 donation to the United Negro College Fund and the attorneys for the plaintiffs received $1.8 million in attorneys' fees.

On January 31, 2008, SLM Corporation paid $35,000,000 to settle a lawsuit for failing to adequately reserve for losses in Sallie Mae's non-traditional portfolio.

A False Claims suit was filed against Sallie Mae by former U.S. Department of Education researcher, Dr. Oberg, in 2009. The suit alleges that Sallie Mae and other lenders deliberately overcharged the U.S. government. The findings by Oberg were labeled among higher education policy analysts as the 9.5 scandal.

On February 20, 2014, Illinois Attorney General Lisa Madigan's office announced that an investigation into Sallie Mae's debt collection practices and loan servicing practices had been opened.

On November 9, 2005, former Sallie Mae employee Michael Zahara filed a federal lawsuit against the company, alleging that it had a pattern and practice of granting forbearance in a purposeful effort to increase total student loan debt. On October 29, 2008, permission was granted to his legal counsel to withdraw from the case, citing "From counsel's perspective, a breakdown in trust has resulted from the discovery that Relator has been arrested for extortion, the circumstances surrounding that arrest, and Relator's failure to disclose the arrest to counsel." On March 12, 2009, the court ruled "dismissal without prejudice" because "the plaintiff has failed to obtain substitute counsel by the deadline."

== Subsidiaries ==
- Sallie Mae Bank
- SLM Financial Corporation

== See also ==
- USA Funds
- Fannie Mae
- Farmer Mac
- Freddie Mac
- Ginnie Mae
