= Teacher Loan Forgiveness =

United States Department of Education student loan forgiveness program

The Teacher Loan Forgiveness program is a student loan forgiveness program administered by the United States Department of Education. This program is intended to encourage individuals to enter and continue in the teaching profession. Under this program, teachers who provide direct classroom teaching, or classroom-type teaching in a nonclassroom setting full-time for five complete and consecutive academic years in a Title 1 eligible school or school district may be eligible to receive loan forgiveness for their federal student loans.

== Eligibility Requirements ==
To qualify for the Teacher Loan Forgiveness you must be a highly qualified teacher. You must not have had an outstanding balance on Direct Loans or Federal Family Education Loan (FFEL) Program loans as of Oct. 1, 1998, or on the date that you obtained a Direct Loan or FFEL Program loan after Oct. 1, 1998. You must have been employed in an elementary or secondary school that is in a school district that qualifies for funds under Title I of the Elementary and Secondary Education Act of 1965, as amended; has been selected by the U.S. Department of Education based on a determination that more than 30 percent of the school’s total enrollment is made up of children who qualify for services provided under Title I; and is listed in the Annual Directory of Designated Low-Income Schools for Teacher Cancellation Benefits.

You must teach full-time for five complete and consecutive academic years.

== Amounts of Forgiveness ==
=== $5,000 ===
For services completed before October 30, 2004 one must be a full-time elementary school teacher who demonstrated knowledge and teaching skills in reading, writing, mathematics, and other areas of the elementary school curriculum; or a full-time secondary school teacher who taught in a subject area that was relevant to your academic major.

For services completed on or after October 30, 2004 one must be a highly qualified full-time elementary or secondary school teacher.

=== $17,500 ===
For all services regardless of date of beginning or completion one must be a highly qualified full-time mathematics or science teacher in an eligible secondary school; or a highly qualified special education teacher whose primary responsibility was to provide special education to children with disabilities, and you taught children with disabilities that corresponded to your area of special education training and have demonstrated knowledge and teaching skills in the content areas of the curriculum that you taught.
