= Michigan Higher Education Assistance Authority =

Government organization

The Michigan Higher Education Assistance Authority (MHEAA) was created by the State of Michigan in 1960 through Public Act 77. One of the major components of MHEAA is the Michigan Guaranty Agency (MGA), the federally designated guarantor of federal student loans in Michigan. In that capacity, MHEAA-MGA primarily backs Michigan students by insuring lenders who disburse federal student loans that they will be reimbursed for their good faith lending.

MHEAA is a body corporate and politic within the Michigan Department of Treasury. Its 15 members are appointed by the Governor of Michigan with advice and consent of the Michigan Senate and consist of representatives from the Michigan education and lending communities as well as the public at large.

MHEAA-MGA operates under guidelines established by the Higher Education Act of 1965, as amended, and is beholden to all federal guidelines established therein.

Although MHEAA-MGA is a state agency, insurance offered by MHEAA-MGA to back student loan activity in Michigan does not constitute or create any liability on behalf of the State of Michigan. In short, MHEAA-MGA operates with the use of federally designated funds which requires strict compliance with federal laws, rules, and regulations.
