= Pennsylvania Higher Education Assistance Agency =

Student financial aid agency

Agency overview
- Formed: 1963
- Jurisdiction: State government of Pennsylvania
- Headquarters: Harrisburg, Pennsylvania
- Website: http://www.pheaa.org

The Pennsylvania Higher Education Assistance Agency (PHEAA, better known as FedLoan) is a quasi-governmental agency that administers several state-level and national higher education student financial aid programs.

== History ==
It was created in 1963 by an Act of the Pennsylvania General Assembly, and engages in loan guaranty, loan servicing, financial aid processing, outreach and other student aid programs.

It was announced on July 8, 2021 that the agency and the United States Department of Education would not continue their relationship, effective on December 14, 2021.

In October 2007, Jack Wagner, the Pennsylvania auditor general, released a report accusing the agency of giving excessive bonuses and incentives. Rep. Bill Adolph, chairman of the agency's board, subsequently scheduled an emergency meeting of the board for Wednesday, October 10, to request the early resignation of the president of the agency, Richard E. Willey, based on reporting from the Pittsburgh Tribune-Review and the Associated Press.

Since 2007, PHEAA has undergone a series of reforms and cost-cutting initiatives including the elimination of management bonuses, automatic salary increases and all sponsorships and advertisements that were not in line with PHEAA's mission. The Board also instituted one of the nation's strictest business and travel expense reimbursement policies. Those reforms resulted in more than $77 million in savings.

== Functions ==
It administers the grant program for the Commonwealth of Pennsylvania, and serves as a coordinating body for other grant programs administered by other state agencies. It also served as one of several student loan guarantors in the United States for the Federal Family Education Loan Program (FFELP), under the Higher Education Act of 1965. It also has a loan servicing operation for student loans that it owns and for lenders under contract. Originally a small student loan guarantor with approximately 5,000 student loans a year after its formation, it at one point managed more than $100 billion in total assets and serves nearly four million students through its various programs.

PHEAA conducts its student loan servicing activities nationally as FedLoan Servicing and American Education Services (AES). FedLoan Servicing was established in 2009 to support the U.S. Department of Education's ability to service student loans owned by the federal government, and is one of a limited number of organizations approved by the Department to service these loans. AES was created to guarantee and service a variety of Federal Family Education Loan Program (FFELP) and private student loan products for lending partners nationwide. PHEAA exited the FedLoan Servicing Market in December 2021.

PHEAA's earnings are used to support its operations and to pay its operating costs, including administration of the Pennsylvania State Grant and other state-funded student aid programs.

As a quasi-governmental agency, AES/PHEAA's board of directors consists of members of the Pennsylvania General Assembly, the secretary of education, and gubernatorial appointees. The legislative members of the Board were successful in passing legislation that restructures the PHEAA Board of Directors, which was signed into law by the Governor on July 9, 2010. This legislation was based on a PHEAA Board resolution that called upon the General Assembly to replace legislative seats on the Board with private-sector individuals who could provide leadership expertise in an increasingly complex financial environment. Specifically, the legislation reduces the number of lawmakers serving on the 20-member Board from 16 to 12. The four legislative seats were replaced with private-sector professionals with experience in banking, investments and information technology; adding their expertise to the decisions that the Board makes on behalf of Pennsylvania students and families. The legislation also reduces the six-year Board term to four years.

== Controversies ==
- In 2007, former Department of Education researcher, Jon Oberlander, filed a False Claims Suit against PHEAA and other lenders. PHEAA is accused of taking advantage of a loophole (now referred to as the 9.5% Scandal), and defrauding U.S. taxpayers of millions of dollars. In its defense, PHEEA argued that sovereign immunity protected it against False Claims Act suits. The company ultimately lost its claim to sovereign immunity, but succeeded in defending itself against Oberg's suit.
- On 8 January 2018, Massachusetts state's attorney general Maura Healey sued the company over its handling of the TEACH grant program and the larger Public Service Loan Forgiveness program. After breaking the story on its Morning Edition broadcast in March 2018, NPR received dozens of responses from teachers all over the country who had experienced the same problem. One in three grants were converted to loans (with interest) for failure to file proper paperwork or even to hand paperwork in one day late.

== See also ==
- List of Pennsylvania state agencies
- Pennsylvania Department of Education
