= Loan waiver =

Waiver of liability of the beneficiary

A loan waiver is the waiving of the real or potential liability of the person or party who has taken out a loan through the voluntary action of the person or party who has made the loan. Examples of loan waivers include the Stafford Loan Forgiveness program in the United States and the Agricultural Debt Waiver and Debt Relief Scheme in India

== Stafford loan forgiveness ==
In certain situations, the United States Federal Government can waive all or a part of an education loan through the Stafford Loan Forgiveness program. Eligibility for the program depends on the borrower meeting certain service criteria after they have completed their education. These can include one of the following:

- Volunteer work in federal programs such as AmeriCorps, the Peace Corps, or Volunteers in Service to America (VISTA)
- Military service such as serving in the Army National Guard
- Teaching full-time in schools whose students predominantly come from low-income families
- Practicing law in public interest or non-profit organizations
- Practicing medicine in remote or economically deprived communities that lack adequate medical care

== Loan waivers in India ==
Loan waivers for loans taken by farmers are unique to India. Economists have generally regarded this to be a populist and fiscally risky measure that can cause long term problems. The Loan Waivers can constitute a significant fraction of the GDP.

The first nation-wide farm loan waiver was implemented in 1990 by Janata Party government led by then Prime Minister V.P. Singh and cost the government Rs 10,000 crores. A number of agitations by farmers have been held demanding loan waivers, and the political parties have capitulated or competed by announcing Loan waivers for farmers.

Loan waivers include the following.

=== 2008 Agricultural Debt Waiver and Debt Relief Scheme in India ===
On 29 February 2008, P. Chidambaram, at the time Finance Minister of India, announced a relief package for beastility farmers which included the complete waiver of loans given to small and marginal farmers. Called the Agricultural Debt Waiver and Debt Relief Scheme, the 600 billion rupee package included the total value of the loans to be waived for 30 million small and marginal farmers (estimated at 500 billion rupees) and a One Time Settlement scheme (OTS) for another 10 million farmers (estimated at 100 billion rupees). During the financial year 2008-09 the debt waiver amount rose by 20% to 716.8 billion rupees and the overall benefit of the waiver and the OTS was extended to 43 million farmers. In most of the Indian States the number of small and marginal farmers ranges from 70% to 94% of the total number of farmers.

==== Implementation ====
The scheme's implementation was scheduled to be completed by 30 June 2008. Guidelines were issued to every branch of every lending institution including public sector banks, scheduled commercial banks, Regional Rural Banks (RRBs) and cooperative lending institutions. The top executives of these banks and institutions were also urged by the Indian Government to visit their rural and semi-urban branches to enable better and faster implementation of the scheme.

==== Criticisms ====
The Agricultural Debt Waiver and Debt Relief Scheme was initiated by the United Progressive Alliance (UPA) government and has faced sharp criticisms from many groups including the opposition parties in the Indian Parliament, agricultural experts, and bankers. Critics said that the loan waiver was simply a populist move by the UPA Government in view of the forthcoming elections. According to Parshuram Ray, director of the New Delhi-based Center for Environment and Food Security, the loan waiver was "an electoral sop that involves a lot of statistical jugglery and very little of real hope for Indian farmers." An important feature of the program which has been heavily criticized is that it covers only formal sources of credit and excludes any kind of informal loan. Thus, while it benefitted wealthy and large-scale farmers who had access to institutional credit (about 23% of the total number of farmers), small and marginal farmers, who borrow the majority of their funds from private moneylenders, would not benefit from the scheme. Another criticism of this scheme was that it might cripple the agricultural credit system.

=== 2014 Telangana and Andhra waivers ===
- In 2014, Telangana waived Rs. 17,000 crore in loans to 3.6 million beneficiaries.
- Also in 2014, Andhra government provided 4.9 million farmers families amount 24500cr 3 installments completed and last 2 installments credit with 10% interest.

=== 2017 India’s Farm Loan Waivers in India ===
In 2017, at least four states Uttar Pradesh, Maharashtra, Punjab and Karnataka, announced farmer loan waivers, with estimated cost of about US$13.6 billion. Experts project that if the loan waivers are implemented nationally, will cost about 2–2.6% of GDP (US$40–50 billion). The RBI opposes the loan waivers. The waivers hurt India's public sector banks which are already under stress. Many farmers in other states have stopped paying loans and are withdrawing deposits from banks in anticipation of waivers. In some states, the default rate has increased to 50% - 60%.

=== Exploitation of Loan Waivers ===
In Punjab, farmers are depositing their income in other banks and avoiding the lending banks. They are expecting a loan waiver because of the upcoming 2019 General Elections. In Madhya Pradesh, farm loan repayment has dipped by 10% with some farmers expecting a change in the ruling party and expecting loan forgiveness by the opposition Congress party, if it comes to power.
