= Title IV of the Higher Education Act of 1965 =

US law governing student financial aid

Title IV of the Higher Education Act of 1965 (HEA) covers the administration of the United States federal student financial aid programs.

American colleges and universities are generally classified with regard to their inclusion under Title IV, such as under the U.S. Department of Education statistics.

== Content ==
Title IV was one of eight titles:

- Title I, General Provisions;
- Title II, Teacher Quality Enhancement;
- Title III, Strengthening Institutions;
- Title IV, Student Assistance;
- Title V, Developing Institutions;
- Title VI, International Education Programs;
- Title VII, Graduate and Postsecondary Improvement Programs; and
- Title VIII, Additional Programs.

Title IV contains nine parts that authorize a broad array of programs and provisions to assist students and their families in gaining access to and financing a postsecondary education. Programs authorized under this title are the primary sources of federal aid supporting postsecondary education.

The act is sectioned:

- A- Grants to attend establishments in approved Title IV programs. (Ten sub-sections)
- B- Federal Family Education Loan (FFEL) Program
- C- Federal Work-Study Programs
- D- Direct Loan Program
- E- Federal Perkins Loans
- F- Need Analysis procedures
- G- General provisions and definitions
- H- Role of States, accrediting and eligibility

== See also ==
- Title IX is about discrimination based on sex, as well as protections against sexual assault in colleges.

== Resources ==
- "Title 20, Chapter 28, Subchapter IV, United States Code 1070, et seq". gpo.gov. (cite 20USC1070)
