= Public Service Loan Forgiveness =

US government program

The Public Service Loan Forgiveness (PSLF) program is a United States government program that was created under the College Cost Reduction and Access Act of 2007 signed into law by President George W. Bush to provide indebted professionals a way out of their federal student loan debt burden by working full-time in public service.

The program permits Direct Loan borrowers who make 120 qualifying monthly payments under a qualifying repayment plan, while working full-time for a qualifying employer, to have the remainder of their balance forgiven. The earliest time in which borrowers could receive forgiveness under the program was after October 1, 2017. The Department of Education reported that 2,215 borrowers had the remainder of their respective student loans forgiven under the program as of April 30, 2020 for a denial rate of 98.5%.

== Qualifying employers ==
Government organizations or agencies (federal, state or local), 501(c)(3) organizations as defined by the IRS, and some other types of not-for-profit organizations providing designated public services qualify for PSLF. Examples of qualifying government employers include but are not limited to public schools, the U.S. military, and public health or welfare agencies. Organizations that qualify under section 501(c)(3), also known as charitable organizations, must only operate for exempt purposes such as charitable, religious, educational, or scientific purposes that do not incur individual benefits or private gain. Examples of 501(c)(3) organizations may include most private educational institutions, homeless shelters, food banks, and nonprofit hospitals. Full-time AmeriCorps or Peace Corps volunteers also qualify for the program.

The nature of the individual's job responsibilities is not a determining factor in whether the employment qualifies.; rather, the employer's status as a qualifying employer is the determining factor.

With limited exception, the individual must be directly employed full-time by the qualifying employer. Government contractors are not eligible unless they are qualifying employers. Another example is the national labs.

=== Executive order aimed at redefining employer eligibility ===
On March 7, 2025, President Donald J. Trump signed and issued Executive Order 14235,^{[ws]} titled "Restoring Public Service Loan Forgiveness", that directs the Secretary of Education to revise the Public Service Loan Forgiveness Program regulations to exclude organizations engaging in activities deemed to have a "substantial illegal purpose" from PSLF eligibility. Actions such as aiding illegal immigration, terrorism, child trafficking, discrimination, and acts of civil disorder were cited in the order as disqualifying activities. In response, concerns regarding the ambiguous scope of the "substantial illegal purpose" have centered on the potential for inadvertently disqualifying individuals employed in widely recognized nonprofit or public service sectors.

The U.S. Department of Education convened negotiated rule-making sessions on July 2, 2025. The committee reached near-unanimous consensus on several provisions and ultimately produced 15 significant revisions to PSLF regulations, to be drafted in a Notice of Proposed Rulemaking (NPRM) and released later in 2025.

On October 30, 2025, the administration finalized the rules, expanding the power of the Education Department to exclude organizations from the program that engage in activities involving a "substantial illegal purpose", including puberty blockers for trans youth (referred to as "chemical castration") and illegal immigration.

== Eligible loans ==
Any loan made under the Direct Loan Program can qualify for PSLF. In particular, Subsidized and Unsubsidized Stafford Loans, PLUS Loans, and Federal Direct Consolidation Loans qualify for PSLF.

Loans in the FFEL program or Federal Perkins Loans can be consolidated into a Direct Consolidation Loan to become eligible for the program. Private student loans are ineligible to be consolidated into a Direct Loan and thus cannot be discharged under the PSLF program.

== Qualifying for forgiveness ==
An individual qualifies for PSLF after making 120 on-time, monthly payments under a qualifying repayment plan while working full-time for a qualifying employer. After the borrower has made 120 qualifying payments, any federal tax implications, although Mississippi taxes forgiveness under PSLF. Currently, there is no cap as to the amount of forgiveness a borrower can receive.

Those interested in receiving PSLF should regularly submit the "Employment Certification Form" for PSLF. This form will be used by the Department of Education's contractor, Higher Education Loan Authority of the State of Missouri (MOHELA), (formerly FedLoan Servicing), to determine whether an individual's employment and payments qualify for the program.

== Qualifying payment plans ==
Multiple plans are available to those interested in the PSLF program. Those wishing to seek forgiveness under the PSLF should make payments under one of the income-driven repayment plans, including Income-Contingent Repayment (ICR), Income-Based Repayment (IBR), or pay-as-you-earn (PAYE).

On May 23, 2018, the U.S. Department of Education announced a second-chance plan for people in public service jobs who were denied loan forgiveness because they chose the wrong repayment plan. The DoED will use $350 million set aside by Congress in a fix-it fund to help people seeking reconsideration. The money will be distributed on a first-come, first-served basis.

== Problems with the program ==
The earliest date that public servants could qualify for full cancelation of their loans was October 1, 2017, ten years after PSLF existed. Problems soon emerged. Of the first 28,000 public servants who applied for forgiveness, only 96 were approved. This is a denial rate of 99 percent. In March 2018 Congress attempted to fix PSLF by passing the Temporary Expanded Public Service Loan Forgiveness program (TEPSLF). According to a Government Accountability Office report of the 54,184 who applied for TEPSLF 53,523 got denied. These denials are the result of many problems, including servicers who provided false or misleading information about whether an account had the right loan type and payment plan to qualify for PSLF. On October 6, 2021, the Biden administration announced a temporary waiver allowing past payments to qualify even if they had the wrong loan type or payment plan. As of March 2022 100,000 people have had over $6.2 billion of student loans canceled as a result of the waiver, however, many problems still persist. The government estimates that 1.3 million public servants qualify for PSLF. FedLoan Servicing continues to incorrectly tell people that they do not qualify for PSLF when in fact they do. FedLoan has also been sending automated messages with inaccurate payment counts. The CFPB has issued a warning to FedLoan. The Department of Education's PSLF help tool will not allow people to select that they have made over 120 payments, forcing people to fill out the form with inaccurate information or find workarounds. Applicants who have reached 120 qualified payments have reported long processing delays of three months or more after submitting PSLF forms to loan servicer, Higher Education Loan Authority of the State of Missouri.

== Future reduction proposals ==
For his 2015 budget proposal to Congress, President Barack Obama proposed capping Public Service Loan Forgiveness at $57,500 for all new borrowers. Analysis at the website Educated Risk, however, details the difficulty of modifying PSLF:

The 2016 Republican budget resolution proposed to eliminate the PSLF program to all new student loan borrowers. A recent GAO report found that the cost of loan forgiveness has been underestimated, leading many commentators to speculate that a new Republican administration and Congress will take steps to curb the problem.

President Donald Trump proposed eliminating the PSLF in his 2018 budget proposal. Similarly, the Republican-proposed PROSPER Act would have eliminated the PSLF. Any changes would have only applied to new borrowers as of July 1, 2019. The PROSPER Act is considered "dead" with Democrats retaking control of the House of Representatives in 2019.

President Trump's 2019 budget proposed eliminating the PSLF. The elimination would have only affected new borrowers as of July 1, 2020. Trump's 2021 fiscal budget made a similar proposal that would only apply to new borrowers.

== Contradictory claims by the government regarding eligibility and litigation ==
In December 2016, it was reported that some employees who had been previously told by the government that their jobs were eligible for the program were later told that their jobs were not eligible. In response, the American Bar Association joined four individual plaintiffs who were denied eligibility under PSLF in a lawsuit against the United States Department of Education to stop the department's decision to retroactively refuse to honor loan forgiveness commitments it made to individuals who "have dedicated their careers to public service." The ABA argued the Department of Education "substantially changed its policy on PSLF-eligible employers" which directly contradicts statutory procedures for modifying regulations requiring public notice and comment periods. On February 22, 2019, a New York federal district court found the Department of Education's actions "arbitrary and capricious." The court found: "In adopting the new standards, the Department failed to display awareness of its changed position, provide a reasoned analysis for that decision and take into account the serious reliance interests affected." The court vacated the department's denial letters and remanded the matters to the Department of Education for reconsideration. Such ruling could lay the groundwork for borrowers who were denied loan forgiveness after being told they were eligible to appeal. The court classified the department's position as "nonsense". The department elected not to appeal the ruling. The Department of Education subsequently stated that all full-time ABA employees are employed in "a public service job" for a "public service organization" as part of a settlement between the ABA and the department. The Education Department further stated that its decision does not restrict the agency from changing the definition of a public service organization in new regulations in the future.

== See also ==
- Teacher Loan Forgiveness
- Federal Direct Student Loan Program
