= Empower (agency) =

- Formerly: Media That Works | Empower MediaMarketing
- Company type: Private
- Industry: Advertising, Marketing, Media
- Founded: 1985
- Founder: Mary Beth Price
- Headquarters: Chicago, IL, United States
- Number of locations: Three
- Area served: United States
- Services: Advertising, Marketing
- Number of employees: 170 (October 2023) across three locations
- Website: www.empowermm.com

Empower is an advertising and marketing agency headquartered in Chicago, IL, founded in Cincinnati in 1985 by Mary Beth Price. The agency was acquired in 2023 by CEO Ashlee Clarke.

== History ==
It was founded by Mary Beth Price in Cincinnati in 1985. The company was acquired by CEO, Ashlee Clarke and Executive Chairman, Chris Clarke, in January 2023.
