= Mpower Financing =

Corporation offering student loans

- Industry: Financial
- Founder: Manu Smadja; Michael Davis
- Headquarters: Washington D.C., United States
- Website: www.mpowerfinancing.com

Mpower Financing (stylized as MPOWER Financing) is a public-benefit corporation. It is based in Washington, DC, with an office in Bangalore, India. It was founded by Manu Smadja and Michael Davis in 2014, both of whom attended INSEAD in Paris where they met.

== Overview ==
Mpower Financing offers its student loans to students who cannot typically qualify for a loan from other banks or lenders unless they have a co-signer or collateral. Mpower Financing lends to students who are within two years from graduation. Many recipients are international (non-American) and DACA students. Mpower Financing's services are available at 350 university and college programs as of March 2018. Around 90% of its borrowers are in graduate school.

== History ==
Mpower Financing was founded by Manu Smadja and Michael Davis in 2014. Both had faced difficulties financing their education in the US, and met in 2009 at INSEAD in Paris while they were working on their MBAs. The company launched officially with Harvard as its first university partner. As of 2021, Mpower has raised $160 million in equity funding and $200 million in debt financing. Investors include Goldman Sachs, King Street Capital Management, and Gray Matters Capital.

In 2016, MPOWER opened an India office, in Bangalore.

In July 2017, Mpower Financing's services became available in all 50 states due to a partnership between the company and Bank of Lake Mills. In August 2017, Mpower Financing announced a $100 million debt round in order to offer more student loans. On February 16, 2017, it was reported that Mpower Financing had received more than $150 million in loan applications. In the summer of 2017, Mpower Financing began working with credit reporting agency Nova Credit to simplify the application and underwriting process for international applicants.

In 2018, Mpower launched its Canadian international student loan program at 12 universities across Ontario and British Columbia. That same year, Mpower added a scholarship program, the Mpower Global Citizenship Scholarship. Four awards are given per year, each one amounting to $5,000.

As of April 2019, it was reported that Mpower Financing had received over $1 billion in loan applications.

== Reception ==
From 2015 to 2017, Mpower Financing revenues increased by 3,000%. In 2015, the company was awarded 1st placed in Village Capital's edtech competition. In February 2017, Mpower Financing was an honorable mention in the list of 20 Washington D.C. tech companies that people should watch. In December 2017, Mpower Financing was awarded Growth Tech Company of the Year by Technical.ly.

It was featured as one of the finalists in the 2018 Tech Madness D.C. Bracket. In 2018, Mpower Financing was named one of the best places to work in the financial technology industry by American Banker. Writer Rob Garver noted that the recipients of the award were noted for their philanthropic efforts, citing Mpower Financing employees' partnership with the "Junior Achievement" program. Lana Bronipolsky, Mpower Financing's VP of Finance, was one of the finalists for the Small Business/Entrepreneurs category at the 19th Annual Women in Technology Leadership Awards.

Impact Alpha writer Dennis Price commented that Davis and Smadja were among the "new builders" of entrepreneurship. A writer for Value Walk listed Mpower Financing among a list of "benefit corporations". In 2019, NerdWallet named Mpower Financing's loan product the Top International Student Loan for 2019. Since its inception, Mpower Financing has processed around $1 billion in loan applications and has provided financing to students from over 200 countries. Current investors include Zephyr, Village Capital, GS2, Fresco Capital, 1776, Ruppert International, University Ventures, Dreamit, Panther Angels, Baltimore Angels, Chilango Ventures and Amlaur. Mpower Financing was featured alongside 16 other startups as part of the accelerator company DreamIt.

== Social impact ==
In November 2018, the company announced that it had hired its first Director of Social Impact, Maureen Klovers. Since then, the company has increased the size of its signature scholarship program, the Global Citizen Scholarship Program and launched four new scholarship programs: the MPOWER Women in STEM Scholarship Program, and—in partnership with La Unidad Latina Foundation—the La Unidad Latina/MPOWERing DACA Students Scholarship Program and La Unidad Latina/MPOWERing Estudiantes Latinoamericanos Scholarship Program.
