= PLUS Loan =

American federal student loan

A PLUS Loan is a student loan in the United States, which is part of the Federal Direct Student Loan Program, offered to parents of students enrolled at least half time, or graduate and professional students, at participating and eligible post-secondary institutions. The original, now obsolete, meaning of the acronym was "Parent Loan for Undergraduate Students".

PLUS loans share some similarities with the Stafford and Perkins loans offered to students: They are offered under Title IV of the Higher Education Act of 1965 (with subsequent amendments) and are therefore backed by the full faith of the United States Government and they can be consolidated through the federal student loan consolidation program

== History ==
=== Changes as of July 1, 2006 ===
Like the Stafford Loan program, the PLUS program changed to a higher, but fixed rate, structure for loans disbursed after midnight, July 1, 2006. The rate offered through the Direct Loan Program was 7.9%. Additionally, the PLUS program was made available for graduate and professional students to borrow to finance their own educations, commonly referred to as the Grad PLUS loan.

=== Changes as of July 1, 2008 ===
For PLUS loans made to parents that are first disbursed on or after July 1, 2008, the borrower has the option of beginning repayment on the PLUS loan either 60 days after the loan is fully disbursed or wait until six months after the dependent student on whose behalf the parent borrowed ceases to be enrolled on at least a half-time basis.

=== Changes as of July 1, 2026 ===
For PLUS loans made to parents on or after July 1, 2026, new annual and lifetime borrowing limits will apply: $20,000 per year and $65,000 total per dependent student. These loans will no longer be eligible for income-driven repayment plans and must be repaid under a fixed-term schedule. Institutions may also impose lower program-specific loan caps at their discretion. Parents with loans prior to this date may continue under previous terms for up to three additional academic years.

== Differences from Stafford and Perkins loans ==
- There are no limits on the amount borrowed up to the cost of attendance minus other financial aid. Living expenses are considered part of the cost of attendance.
- The repayment schedule for Direct PLUS Loans disbursed on or after July 1, 2008 is the same as the schedule for Stafford loans. However, for Direct PLUS Loans first disbursed before July 1, 2008, the repayment period begins at the time the PLUS loan is fully disbursed, and the first payment is due within 60 days after the final disbursement. Repayment may be deferred while at least a half-time student; however, the unpaid interest is added to the principal.
- The interest rate is currently fixed at 6.28% and charged from the date of the first disbursement until the loan is paid in full.
- For undergraduate students, the loan is a commitment by the parent, rather than the student.
- Several different repayment plans are available.
- Credit history is taken into account, while with Stafford loans it is not.
- Do not have the postponement and discharge (cancellation) options available with Stafford loans.
