= Federal Family Education Loan Program =

U.S.A. student loan program superseded by Federal Direct Student Loans

The Federal Family Education Loan (FFEL) Program was a system of private student loans which were subsidized and guaranteed by the United States federal government. The program issued loans from 1965 until it was ended in 2010. Similar loans are now provided under the Federal Direct Student Loan Program, which are federal loans issued directly by the United States Department of Education.

The FFEL was initiated by the Higher Education Act of 1965 and was funded through a public/private partnership administered at the state and local level. In 2007-08, FFEL served 6.5 million students and parents, lending a total of $54.7 billion in new loans (or 80% of all new federal student loans). Since 1965, 60 million Americans have used FFEL loans to pay for education expenses. Following the passage of the Health Care and Education Reconciliation Act of 2010 on January 5, 2010 the program was terminated, and no subsequent loans were permitted to be made under the program after June 30, 2010.

== Overview ==
In the FFEL Program, private lenders made federally guaranteed student loans to parents and students. Commercial lenders (e.g. Sallie Mae; now Navient) would use their private capital to finance loans under the FFELP but received subsidies from the federal government. These subsidies were used to maintain interest rates at the federally mandated levels, pay down fees associated with the loans and cover expenses associated with collection and defaults. The government also guaranteed a large portion of the loans, insuring private lenders against default. If a parent or student defaults, the private lender was reimbursed by the government for its losses. In contrast, under the Direct Loan program, the government lends directly to students using federal funds provided to it by the US Treasury.

== Loan types ==
The FFELP offers four types of loans: the subsidized Federal Stafford Loans, unsubsidized Federal Stafford loans, the Federal PLUS Loan for graduate students and for parents of dependent undergraduate students, and consolidation loans.

The main federal student loan is the Stafford Loan. There are two types of Stafford loans:

- Subsidized. For students who meet a financial needs test, the government pays all interest costs on behalf of borrowers while they are in school, and during grace and deferment periods. Repayment begins six months after graduation or the student withdraws to a less than half time status.
- Unsubsidized. Students who do not meet a financial needs test or who need to supplement their subsidized loans may receive unsubsidized Stafford loans. Borrowers may defer payment of interest during school, grace, and deferment periods, but they are responsible for all interest that accrues. Repayment begins six months after graduation or the student withdraws to a less than half time status.

=== Interest rates ===
Interest rates are set by law, as follows:

- For most Stafford loans made before July 1, 2006: Variable rate applies (changing annually with an 8.25% cap).
- Stafford loans made beginning July 1, 2006: 6.8%.
- New subsidized Stafford loans to undergraduates beginning July 1, 2008 (per recent budget reconciliation law):
  - 6.0% for a loan first disbursed between July 1, 2008, and June 30, 2009
  - 5.6% for a loan first disbursed between July 1, 2009, and June 30, 2010
  - 4.5% for a loan first disbursed between July 1, 2010, and June 30, 2011
  - 3.4% for a loan first disbursed between July 1, 2011, and June 30, 2012
- Interest rate under the new law does not extend to loans disbursed after June 30, 2012. The rate for these new loans will revert to 6.8%. The law did not affect new unsubsidized Stafford loans. The rate remains 6.8%
- PLUS loans made beginning July 1, 2006: 8.5% in FFEL Program; 7.9% in DL Program. For PLUS loans made before July 1, a variable rate applies (with a 9.00% cap).
- The House passed a resolution in May 2013 to tie student loan rates to free market loan rates. Every year, student loan interest rates will adjust to fit the market. subsidized and unsubsidized rates will cap at 8.5%.

== Loan forgiveness ==
Because they are private loans, loans granted under the FFEL program are not eligible for the Public Service Loan Forgiveness program. There have been media reports of many FFEL borrowers unaware their loans were ineligible. FFEL borrowers can gain access to loan forgiveness by consolidating an existing loan with the Federal Direct Student Loan Program, but payments made before consolidating do not typically count toward loan forgiveness. However, under a new limited waiver announced October 6, 2021 by the Department of Education, FFEL loans can now be consolidated with previous payments made before consolidation considered qualifying payments.

== End of new loans ==
On 24 April 2009, President Barack Obama called for an end to the FFEL program, calling it a wasteful and inefficient system of "taxpayers...paying banks a premium to act as middlemen—a premium that costs the American people billions of dollars each year....a premium we cannot afford." A Congressional Budget Office review in July 2009 showed that if the government did the direct lending itself, rather than use private sector lenders via FFEL, it would save $80 billion over ten years. That estimate was later downgraded to $61 billion after the Congressional Budget Office revised its estimates for 2010.

America's Student Loan Providers, an industry lobbying group representing private lenders, issued a prepared statement on April 6, 2009 stating "a growing consensus" among legislators "that large scale changes in the financial aid delivery system should be carefully considered."

The program was ended according to the provisions of the Student Aid and Fiscal Responsibility Act, which passed in 2010 as a rider bill to the Health Care and Education Reconciliation Act of 2010.
