= Federal Perkins Loan =

US government student loan

A Federal Perkins Loan, also referred to as a Perkins Loan, was a need-based student loan offered by U.S. Department of Education from 1958 until 2017. Created as part of the Federal Direct Student Loan Program, the Perkins Loan served to assist American college students fund their post-secondary education. The program was named after Carl D. Perkins, a former member of the U.S. House of Representatives from Kentucky.

== Provisions ==
Perkins Loans carried a fixed interest rate of 5% for the duration of the ten-year repayment period. The Perkins Loan Program had a nine-month grace period, so that borrowers began repayment in the tenth month upon graduating, falling below half-time status, or withdrawing from their college or university. Since the Perkins Loan was subsidized by the government, interest did not begin to accrue until the borrower began to repay the loan.

In the 2009–2010 academic year, the loan limits for undergraduates were $5,500 per year with a lifetime maximum loan of $27,500. For graduate students, the limit was $8,000 per year with a lifetime limit of $60,000 (including undergraduate loans).

=== Cancellation eligibility ===
Perkins Loans were eligible for Federal Loan Cancellation for individuals choosing to work in a number of different public service occupations including early childhood education, elementary and secondary school teaching, speech therapy, nursing, law enforcement, librarian, public defense attorney, fire fighting and certain active duty military postings. Depending on the field of employment, further restrictions on the setting of employment may apply.

For example, forgiveness for teachers may be restricted to designated low-income schools or specific teacher shortage areas such as math, science, and bilingual education and forgiveness for nurses requires employment at a non-profit medical facility. A percentage of the loan was cancelled for each year spent teaching full-time (as long as the loan remains in good standing). This cancellation also applies to Peace Corps Volunteers. Cancellation typically occurs on a graduating scale: 15% for year 1, 15% for year 2, 20% for year 3, 20% for year 4, 30% for year 5. These percentages were based on the original debt amount. Thus after 3 years of service, one would have 50% of their original debt cancelled.

== End of program ==
On September 30, 2017, the Federal Perkins Loan program failed to renew in Congress, thus effectively ending the loan program.

== See also ==
- Stafford Loan
- Student loans in the United States
