= Federal Direct Student Loan Program =

Federally-backed student loan program in the United States

The William D. Ford Federal Direct Loan Program (also called FDLP, FDSLP, and Direct Loan Program) provides "low-interest loans for students and parents to help pay for the cost of a student's education after high school. The lender is the U.S. Department of Education ... rather than a bank or other financial institution." It is the largest single source of federal financial aid for students and their parents pursuing post-secondary education. In many cases, Direct Loan Program is the first financial obligation young people incur, with borrowers paying back their debts in an average of 19.4 years. The program is named after William D. Ford, a former member of the U.S. House of Representatives from Michigan.

Following the passage of the Health Care and Education Reconciliation Act of 2010, the Federal Direct Loan Program is the sole government-backed loan program in the United States. The program replaced the earlier Federal Family Education Loan (FFEL) program which issued "guaranteed loans" — loans originated and funded by private lenders but guaranteed by the government. The FFEL program was eliminated because of a perception that it benefited private student loan companies at the expense of taxpayers, but did not help reduce costs for students.

The Federal Direct Loan Program has accumulated a very large outstanding loan portfolio of about $1.5 trillion and this number will continue to rise along with the percentage of defaults. A common concern associated with the program is the effect on the economy and repercussions for students that must repay these loans.

== History ==
President George H. W. Bush authorized a pilot version of the Direct Loan program, by signing into law the 1992 Reauthorization of the Higher Education Act of 1965. The Higher Education Act was passed to give greater college access to women and minorities.

President Bill Clinton set a phase-in of direct lending, by signing into law the Omnibus Budget Reconciliation Act of 1993, although in 1994 the 104th Congress passed legislation to prevent the switch to 100% direct lending.

Funding for new direct loans in the Federal Direct Student Loan Program increased from $12.6 billion in 2005 to $17.8 billion in 2008.

President Barack Obama organized all new loans under the Direct Loan program by July 2010. The switch to 100% Direct Lending effective July 1, 2010 was enacted by the Health Care and Education Reconciliation Act of 2010.

In 1940, only about 500,000 Americans attended college, but by 1970 that number was near 7.5 million and now in 2018 that number is estimated to be around 14 million. Since 1970, family incomes for 80% of Americans have failed to make inflation-adjusted gains. With college costs skyrocketing, the lack of wage increases forced most students to rely on student aid and student loans.

In comparison, other countries have also experimented with government-sponsored loan programs. New Zealand, for instance, now offers 0% interest loans to students who live in New Zealand for 183 or more consecutive days (retroactive for all former students who had government loans), who can repay their loans based on their income after they graduate. This program was a Labour Party promise in the 2005 general election.

== Types of loans ==
There are four types of direct loans:

- Direct PLUS Loan: The direct PLUS loan is a federal loan that graduate or professional students and parents of undergraduate students can use to pay for their education. These loans can be used to help pay for education expenses not covered by financial aid. The Direct PLUS loan is not based on financial need, but credit is necessary. Eligibility is determined by the school and once the student has signed, he or she has entered into a legally binding agreement to repay all the loans. In a parent PLUS loan, the parent can authorize the school to use the loan for other educationally related charges after tuition and room and board.
- Direct Subsidized: A direct subsidized federal loan is for eligible students to cover costs at a four-year institution, community college, or vocational school. Only students with demonstrated financial need are eligible and the amount is determined by the school. The US Department of Education pays the interest on the loan while the student is in school and he or she gets a grace period of six months after graduating.
- Direct Unsubsidized: Unlike Subsidized loans, these federal loans do not require students to demonstrate financial need and they are responsible for paying interest on the loan during all periods. If the student chooses not to pay the interest while in school, the interest will accumulate and be added to the principal.
- Direct Consolidation: These loans enable the student to consolidate multiple federal loans into one loan at no added cost. If a student has multiple loans, he or she can consolidate multiple monthly payments into one monthly payment at the average rate of the loans being consolidated. One disadvantage is that students cannot lower their interest rates. The interest rate is equal to a weighted average of the interest rates on their current federal student loans, rounded up to the nearest 1/8%.

== Current program size ==
Currently, there are $1.2 trillion in principal and interest on direct loans remained outstanding (borrowed by 34.5 million individuals). At the end of 2019, there were $657 billion in outstanding Direct Loan program loans for 32.1 million recipients. The Federal Student Aid office (FSA), which is responsible for managing the outstanding loan portfolio, reported that at the end of 2009 there were $1.5 trillion of loans outstanding which is spread out over 42.9 million unduplicated recipients. In 10 years, the loan program experienced 230% growth in the loan portfolio and 130% growth in the loan recipients. Student loan debt in 2019 is the highest it has ever been. According to the latest loan debt statistics, student loan debt has become the second highest consumer debt category behind mortgage debt. The government combats this large outstanding balance with student loan forgiveness which come in several forms, the two most popular being Public Service Loan Forgiveness and Teacher Loan Forgiveness. Looking at Public Service Loan Forgiveness, there are 890,516 borrowers and 41,221 submitted applications, only 423 of these applications were approved. This translated into about $12.3 million of forgiven loans, leaving the rest of the hundreds of millions left to be paid. Unsurprisingly, the states with the largest populations have the largest proportions of debt. California, Florida, Texas, and New York represent more than 20% of all student debt ($340 billion).

Loan portfolio balances managed by the FSA for the Federal Family Education Loan Program are slowly and steadily shrinking as new loans offered to students by the U.S. Department of Education now originate under the FDSLP. Most of the growth in FDSLP loan portfolio balances can be attributed to the number of new loans, as it is now the sole government program for student loans. Another contributor to the rapid escalation in loan balances is due to the cost of higher education increasing rapidly, faster than inflation. Students are spending and borrowing more to finance their higher-priced higher education.

== Default ==
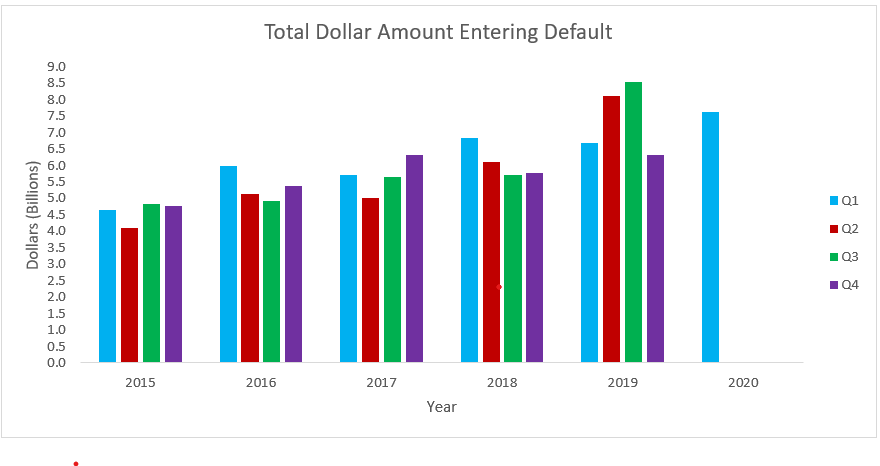
Graphic 1: Total number of dollars (in billions) entering default, 2009–2018, data source: CRS

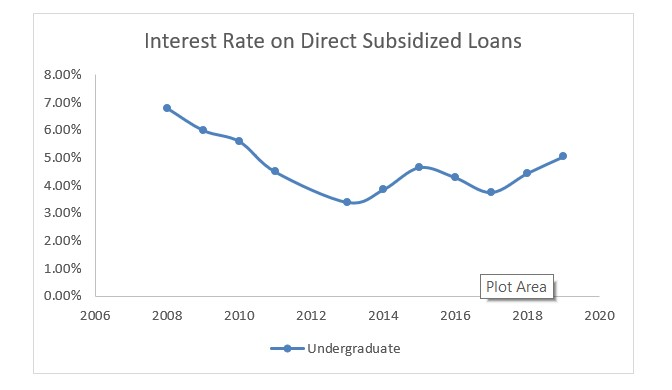
Graphic 2: This graph portrays the changes in the interest rate for direct subsidized loans, 2004-2019

Default and delinquency are increasingly common and are a large risk the government bears when giving out low-interest rate loans. Delinquency, or late or missing payments, will result in those payments being reported to the credit bureaus and credit scores being adjusted accordingly. When a student loan borrower moves to default, the next step in the process, the consequences are much more severe. A borrower is considered to have defaulted when he or she fails to make required payments for 270 days. When a loan is in default, the principal and interest are due in full as well as collection costs. The current default rate for the 1.56 trillion total outstanding dollars of debt among 44.7 million borrowers is 11.4%. According to estimates made in 2018 from the Department of Education reports, 40% of borrowers are expected to default on their loans by 2023. Over the average length of repayment which is 19 years, 250,000 students default on their loans each quarter while 1.5 trillion outstanding dollars are still supposed to be paid. Defaulting can disqualify a student for any additional Title IV federal student aid in the future. In many instances, the payment of federal student loans will cover any interest accruing between payments. However, if interest accrues between payments of the loan then the lender can capitalize the accrued interest by increasing the principal balance of the loan. The growing principal balance results in higher interest payments and a greater overall cost of the loan.

Pew Charitable Trusts research highlights the increasing number of student loan borrowers who encounter repayment problems or interruptions. As of October 2018, the number of student loan borrowers in default in the United States was more than 8 million, which equates to about 1 in 5 federal student loan borrowers. The numbers may even be understated because of the large number of students still in school or within the grace period. As previously mentioned, default consequences are severe and can include damaged credit, ineligibility for future student loans, garnishment of wages, high collection fees, loss of federal income tax refunds or Social Security and prohibition from other federal assistance programs. Additionally, the increasing number of defaults has an impact on the taxpayer. The federal government spent more than $600 million in 2016 and projects costs to exceed more than $1 billion in the near future.

For comparison, a study published in 1997 that draws back from the 1980s established that one-fifth of undergraduates borrow in the Stafford Loan previously known as the Guaranteed Student Loan Program. Freshmen could only borrow $2625, $3500 for sophomores, and $5500 for each year thereafter without collateral or credit. Now Freshmen can borrow $5500, Sophomores $6500, and juniors $7500. The study predicted that students failing to repay those loans would be a huge cost to the government, which we now know is true. The estimate was that in the 1990s the defaulted student loans would cost the government at least two to three billion dollars each year. From the graphic 1 above, it is apparent that the number of students entering default has surmounted that estimate.

== Associated problems and proposed solutions ==
Some believe that the growth of student loan debt is reaching problematic levels. Economists point to a drag on the economy as a whole because of high levels of student debt. One way that has been suggested to help students with loan repayment is to lower interest on balances. U.S. Senator Richard Blumenthal urged, "We must reduce the student loan interest rate back to 3.4 percent immediately, and then even lower, and develop ways for past students to reduce and erase the $1 trillion in existing debt. The failure of Congress to act now threatens our all too slow and fragile economic recovery and job creation." Another way to deal with debt to income levels is to require higher learning accountability. "Only recently have government regulators demanded accountability for the educational benefits universities produce and the efficiency with which they produce them: What does college cost? How many students are admitted? How many graduate? How long does it take them to graduate? How many get good jobs? At the same time, accrediting bodies have changed their measurement emphasis from inputs and activities to outcomes...Students want not just high-paying jobs, but an acceptable ratio of starting salary to student debt. Governments likewise care not just about the number of graduates but the total cost of producing each graduate." These questions warrant consideration in the future conversations about the Federal Student Loan Program.

Another solution to the problem was discussed in the 2020 Presidential Election. Candidates Bernie Sanders and Elizabeth Warren both offered programs for loan forgiveness. Senator Bernie Sanders proposed canceling all $1.6 trillion of outstanding student loan debt in the United States while Senator Elizabeth Warren proposed canceling $640 billion of the debt. Both have goals to make public university tuition free, reducing the need for borrowing. According to the Department of Education, 45% of student loans are used to attend public colleges and universities. The department also reports that 40% of loans are taken out to attend graduate or professional school, meaning most loans are taken out for post-graduate education or private schools. So even if all debt is wiped out, the rate at which it grows would remain the same. These plans would also have unintended consequences, demonstrating that future debt could be forgiven as well.

The Stafford Student Loan Program is a subsidized loan that has been criticized for its lack of reform. Its structure has not changed much since its creation in 1965. The problems are that it is too costly, a wasteful subsidy for middle-income students, acts as disincentive for students to save, and providing an incentive for colleges to raise tuition. The issue that it is a disincentive for students to save is widely cited. The government is issuing cheap loans that are widely available and more than ever, students are attending expensive schools and are less worried about their ability to repay the debt. Students are not incentivized to attend schools with lower tuition. This is exacerbated by the fact that federal financial aids provides less support for students going to community college. They are low cost institutions to begin with but are disadvantaged by both state and federal aid. Data was collected by the National Postsecondary Student Aid Study (NPSAS) and the results of the study revealed that the percentage of lower-income students receiving federal aid awards significantly favored private proprietary and non-profit 2-year students and institutions. The average federal grant allocation to students attending public community colleges was 49% lower than federal awards granted to private baccalaureate institution students. Also, only one in three public community college students from the lowest income group received federal grant aid while three out of every four students at private baccalaureate institutions received this aid.

It has been argued that at the individual level student loan debt affects students when it comes to their credit worthiness and future financial stability. In aggregate, the large portfolio of loans can hamper economic growth.
