= Stafford Loan =

Type of student loan in the U.S.

A Stafford Loan was a student loan offered from the United States Department of Education to eligible students enrolled in accredited American institutions of higher education to help finance their education. The terms of the loans are described in Title IV of the Higher Education Act of 1965 (with subsequent amendments), which guarantees repayment to the lender if a student defaults. As of July 1, 2010, Stafford Loans are no longer being offered, having been replaced with the William D. Ford Federal Direct Student Loan Program.

In 1988, Congress renamed the Federal Guaranteed Student Loan program the Robert T. Stafford Student Loan program, in honor of U.S. Senator Robert Stafford, a Republican from Vermont, for his work on higher education.

Stafford loans were guaranteed by the full faith of the US government, and were offered at a lower interest rate than the borrower would otherwise be able to get for a private loan. On the other hand, there were strict eligibility requirements and borrowing limits on Stafford Loans.

As with other types of federal financial aid, students who applied for a Stafford Loan were required to complete a FAFSA. While the student was enrolled for at least half-time they were not expected to pay any principal payments on the loan, a status referred to as in-school deferment. Deferment of repayment continued for six months after the student leaves school by graduating, dropping below half-time enrollment, or withdrawing, referred to as the grace period.

Stafford Loans were available both as subsidized and unsubsidized loans. Subsidized loans are offered to students based on demonstrated financial need (see Expected Family Contribution). The interest on subsidized loans is paid by the federal government while the student is in school and during authorized deferment. For unsubsidized Stafford Loans, students are responsible for all of the interest that accrues while the student is enrolled in school. The interest may be deferred throughout enrollment. Unpaid interest that is deferred until after graduation is capitalized (added to the loan principal).

The Budget Control Act of 2011 eliminated subsidized Stafford loans for graduate and professional students effective July 1, 2012. Unsubsidized Stafford loans are still available to these students.

== Interest rates ==
Interest rates on Stafford Loans may vary and are determined based upon the date the loan was disbursed. They may also vary by the education level (undergraduate or graduate) of the student. Interest rates do not vary with default risk: all students receive the same interest rate regardless of their major or their future employment prospects.

For variable rate loans, the rates are set annually using the price of the 91-day Treasury bill on the last Monday of May, and become effective for the following year on July 1. For fiscal year 2008–2009, the 91-day Treasury bill auctioned on May 27, 2008, at 1.905% (rounded to 1.91%) was used for the calculation. On May 26, 2009, the 91-day Treasury bill was auctioned at an investment rate of 0.178%. On July 1, 2009, the base rate for variable rate Stafford Loans were adjusted to 0.18%. Loans issued before July 1, 1998, were adjusted to a rate of 3.28%. Loans issued between July 1, 1998, and June 30, 2006, were adjusted to a rate of 2.48%.

On August 9, 2013, President Obama signed the Bipartisan Student Loan Certainty Act of 2013, changing how student loan interest rates are determined. The bill links student loan rates to the Federal 10-year Treasury rate, plus a small margin. The new rates are retroactive for all loans disbursed on or after July 1, 2013. That effectively reversed an increase in interest rate from 3.40% to 6.80% for affected loans. Federal student loan interest rates are fixed for the life of the loan; however, the rates for new loans will change annually, based on the current market. The interest rates for the 2013–2014 academic year are as follows: 3.86% for undergraduate Stafford Loans (both subsidized and unsubsidized) 5.41% for graduate Stafford Loans

== See also ==
- Loan waiver
