= Domestic policy of the Trump administration =

The domestic policy of the Trump administration may refer to:

- Domestic policy of the first Trump administration
- Domestic policy of the second Trump administration
