= Science policy of the Trump administration =

The science policy of the Trump administration may refer to:

- Science policy of the first Trump administration
- Science policy of the second Trump administration
