= Domestic policy of the first Trump administration =

This article encompasses the domestic policy of Donald Trump as the 45th president of the United States.

Trump had mixed success in delivering on his domestic policy campaign promises, which included limiting immigration, fortifying public infrastructure, cutting taxes, and repealing the Affordable Care Act. He also worked to encourage space exploration, implement the Tax Cuts and Jobs Act, work on deregulation, address economic growth and unemployment, and work on trade.

Trump was also in office during COVID-19, and directed responses to the pandemic. President Trump also handled relief for three severe hurricanes and several large wildfires and signed the Disaster Recovery Reform Act.

== Agriculture ==
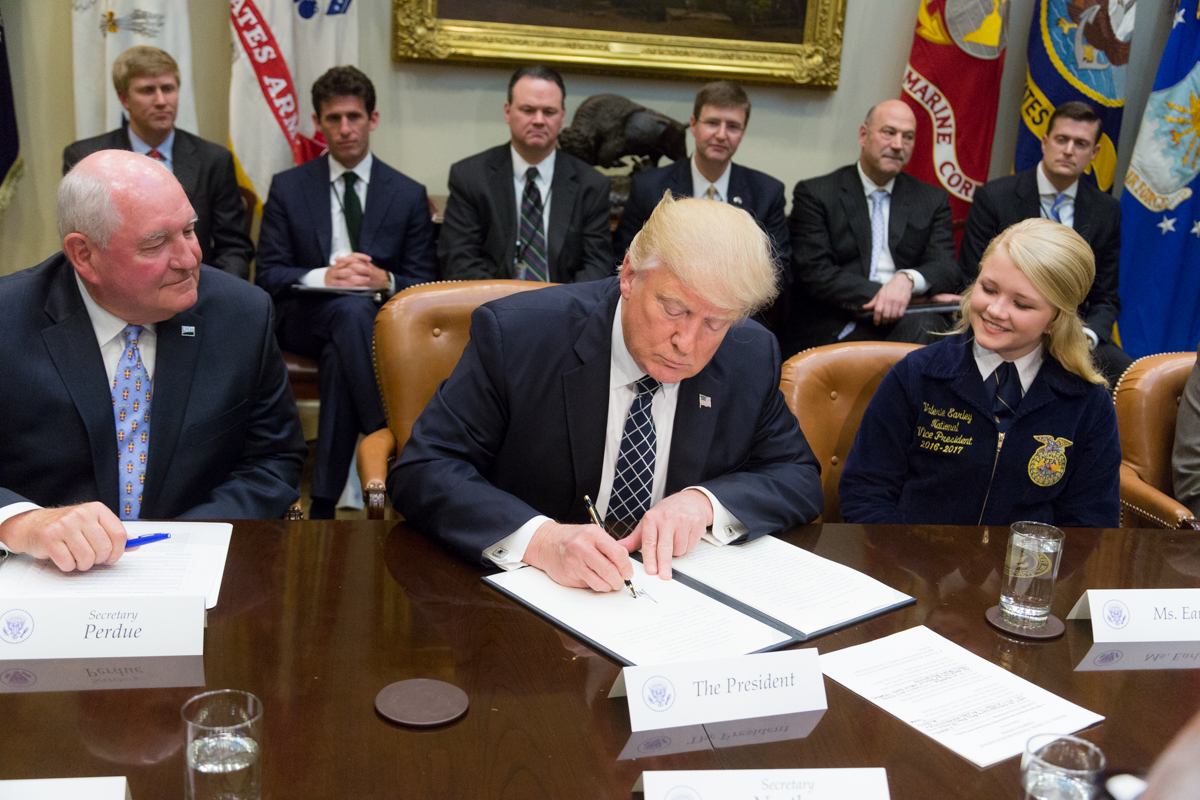
Trump signs an Executive Order on "Agriculture and Rural Prosperity" on April 25, 2017.

Due to Trump's trade tariffs combined with depressed commodities prices, American farmers faced the worst crisis in decades. Trump provided farmers $12 billion in direct payments in July 2018 to mitigate the negative impacts of his tariffs, increasing the payments by $14.5 billion in May 2019 after trade talks with China ended without agreement. Most of the administration's aid went to the largest farms. Politico reported in May 2019 that some economists in the United States Department of Agriculture were being punished for presenting analyses showing farmers were being harmed by Trump's trade and tax policies, with six economists having more than 50 years of combined experience at the Service resigning on the same day. Trump's fiscal 2020 budget proposed a 15% funding cut for the Agriculture Department, calling farm subsidies "overly generous".

== Consumer protections ==
The administration reversed a Consumer Financial Protection Bureau (CFPB) rule that had made it easier for aggrieved consumers to pursue class actions against banks; the Associated Press characterized the reversal as a victory for Wall Street banks. Under Mick Mulvaney's tenure, the CFPB reduced enforcement of rules that protected consumers from predatory payday lenders. Trump scrapped a proposed rule from the Obama administration that airlines disclose baggage fees. Trump reduced enforcement of regulations against airlines; fines levied by the administration in 2017 were less than half of what the Obama administration did the year before.

== Criminal justice ==
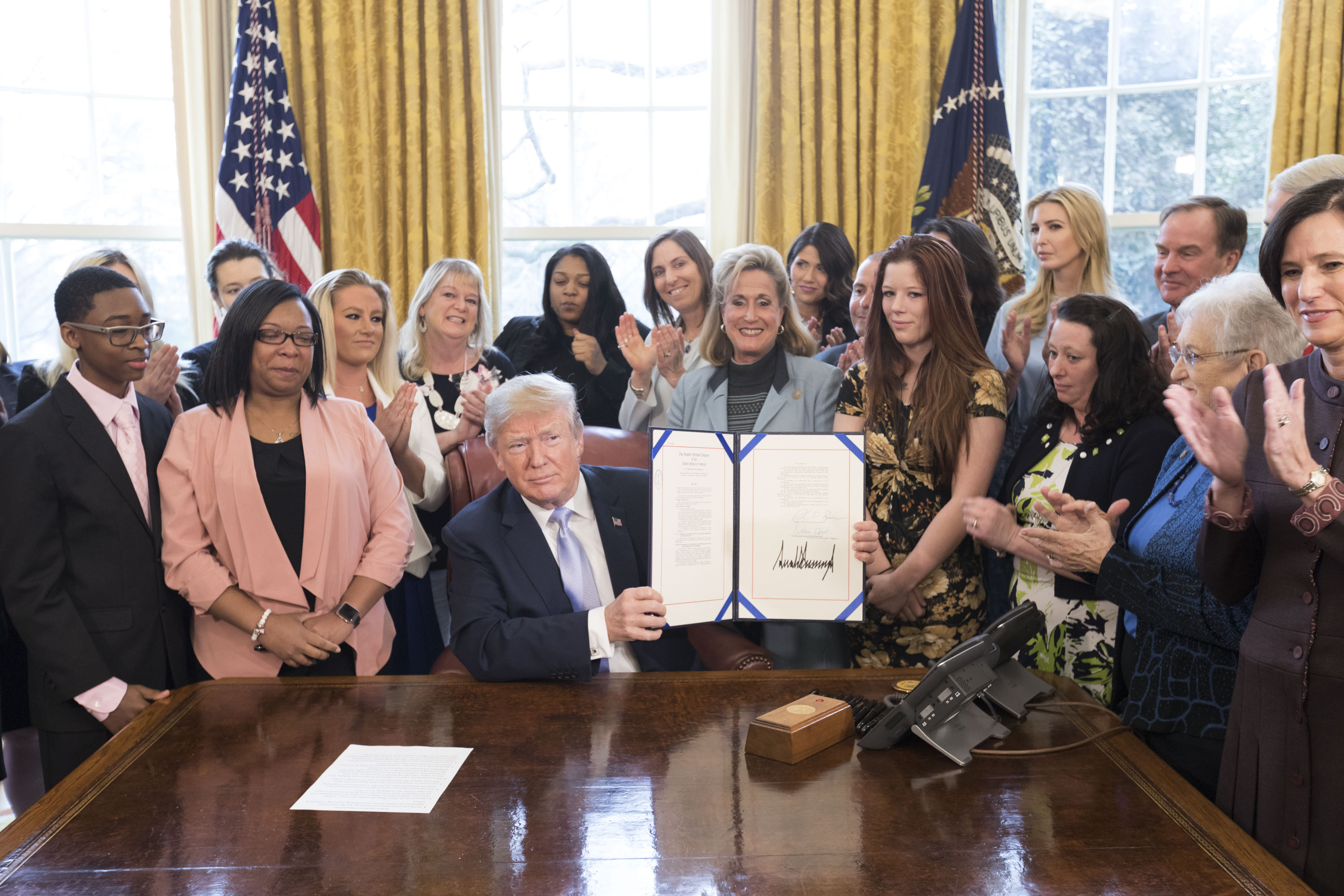
Trump signed FOSTA-SESTA on April 16, 2018.

The New York Times summarized the Trump administration's "general approach to law enforcement" as "cracking down on violent crime", "not regulating the police departments that fight it", and overhauling "programs that the Obama administration used to ease tensions between communities and the police". Trump reversed a ban on providing federal military equipment to local police departments and reinstated the use of civil asset forfeiture. The administration stated that it would no longer investigate police departments and publicize their shortcomings in reports, a policy previously enacted under the Obama administration. Later, Trump falsely claimed that the Obama administration never tried to reform the police.

In December 2017, Sessions and the Department of Justice rescinded a 2016 guideline advising courts against imposing large fines and fees on poor defendants.

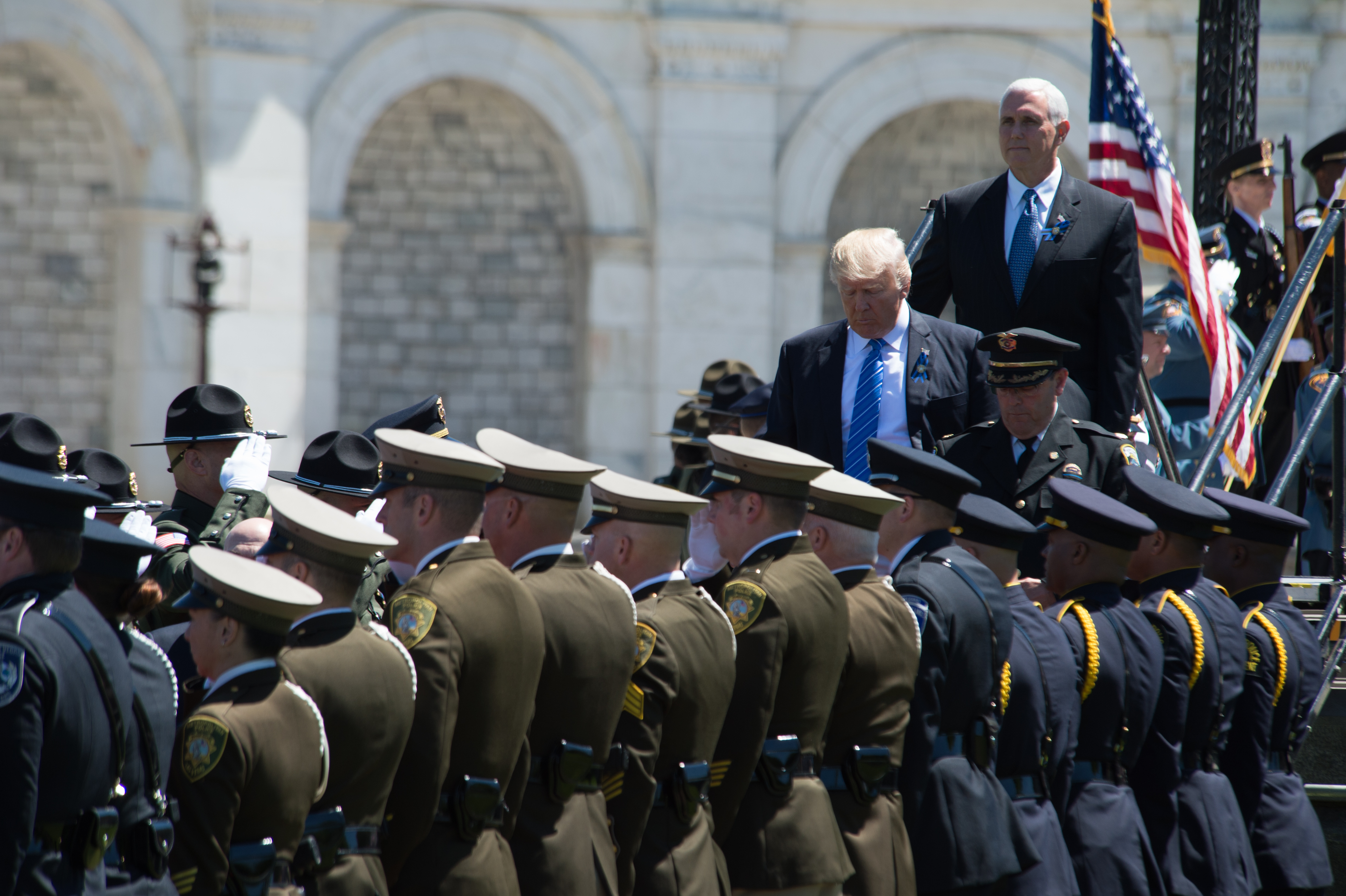
Trump pays tribute to fallen police officers on May 15, 2017, Peace Officers Memorial Day.

Despite Trump's pro-police rhetoric, his 2019 budget plan proposed nearly fifty percent cuts to the COPS Hiring Program which provides funding to state and local law enforcement agencies to help hire community policing officers. Trump appeared to advocate police brutality in a July 2017 speech to police officers, prompting criticism from law enforcement agencies. In 2020, the inspector general of the Department of Justice criticized the Trump administration for reducing police oversight and eroding public confidence in law enforcement.

In December 2018, Trump signed the First Step Act, a bipartisan criminal justice reform bill which sought to rehabilitate prisoners and reduce recidivism, notably by expanding job training and early-release programs, and lowering mandatory minimum sentences for nonviolent drug offenders.

The number of prosecutions of child-sex traffickers has showed a decreasing trend under the Trump administration relative to the 2nd term of Obama administration. Under the Trump administration, the SEC charged the fewest number of insider trading cases since the Reagan administration.

=== Presidential pardons and commutations ===
During his presidency, Trump pardoned or commuted the sentences of 237 individuals. Most of those pardoned had personal or political connections to Trump. A significant number had been convicted of fraud or public corruption. Trump circumvented the typical clemency process, taking no action on more than ten thousand pending applications, using the pardon power primarily on "public figures whose cases resonated with him given his own grievances with investigators".

=== Drug policy ===
In a May 2017 departure from the policy of the Department of Justice under Obama to reduce long jail sentencing for minor drug offenses and contrary to a growing bipartisan consensus, the administration ordered federal prosecutors to seek maximum sentencing for drug offenses. In a January 2018 move that created uncertainty regarding the legality of recreational and medical marijuana, Sessions rescinded a federal policy that had barred federal law enforcement officials from aggressively enforcing federal cannabis law in states where the drug is legal. The administration's decision contradicted then-candidate Trump's statement that marijuana legalization should be "up to the states". That same month, the VA said it would not research cannabis as a potential treatment against PTSD and chronic pain; veterans organizations had pushed for such a study. In December 2018, Trump signed the Agriculture Improvement Act of 2018, which included de-scheduling certain cannabis products, leading to a rise in legal Delta-8—a step which resembled legalization.

=== Capital punishment ===
Between July 2020 and the end of Trump's term, the federal government executed thirteen people; the first executions since 2002. In this time period, Trump oversaw more federal executions than any president in the preceding 120 years.

== Disaster relief ==
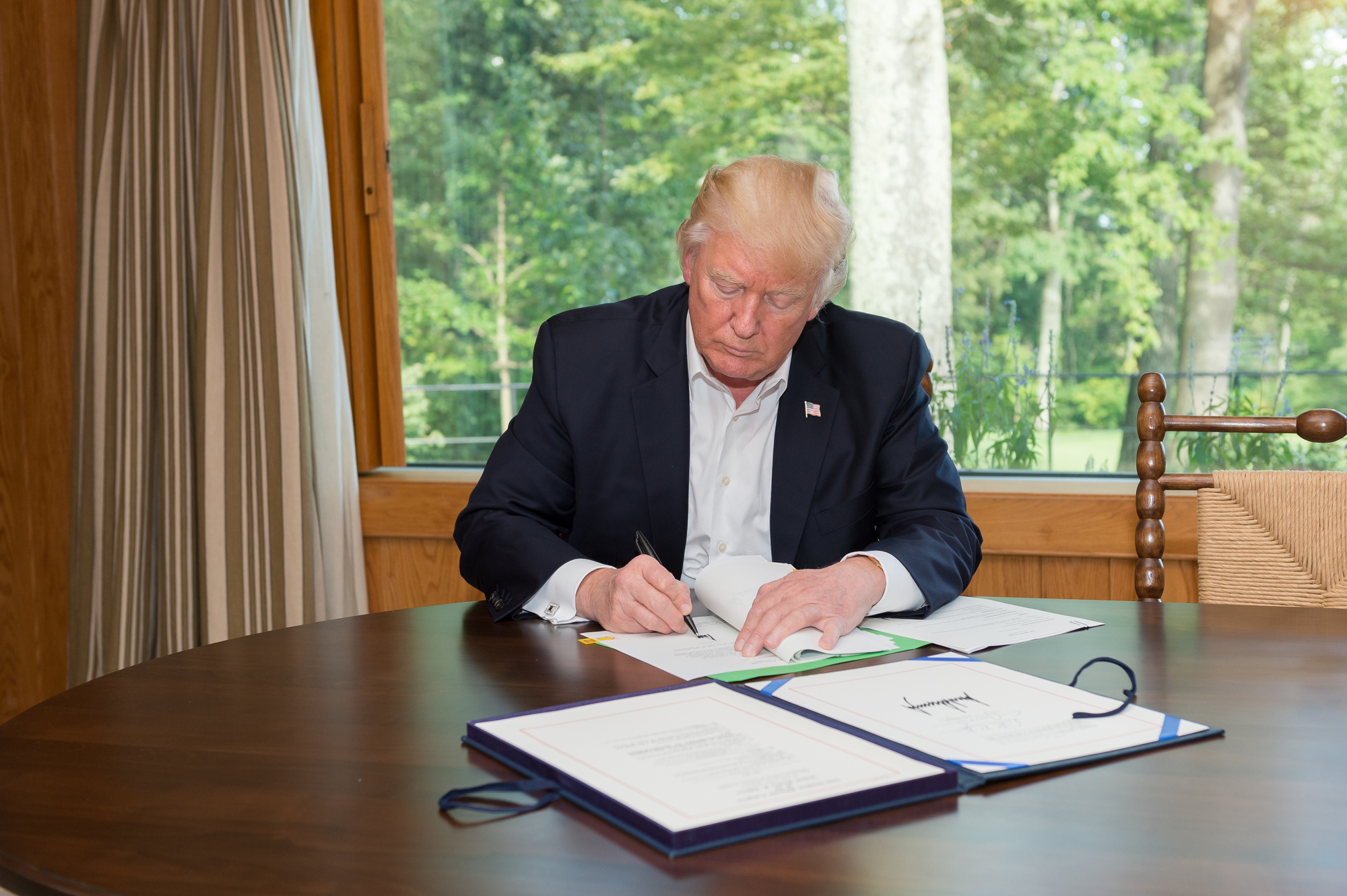
Trump signs the Hurricane Harvey relief bill at Camp David, September 8, 2017.

=== Hurricanes Harvey, Irma, and Maria ===
Three hurricanes hit the U.S. in August and September 2017: Harvey in southeastern Texas, Irma on the Florida Gulf coast, and Maria in Puerto Rico. Trump signed into law $15 billion in relief for Harvey and Irma, and later $18.67 billion for all three. The administration came under criticism for its delayed response to the humanitarian crisis on Puerto Rico. Politicians of both parties had called for immediate aid for Puerto Rico, and criticized Trump for focusing on a feud with the National Football League instead. Trump did not comment on Puerto Rico for several days while the crisis was unfolding. According to The Washington Post, the White House did not feel a sense of urgency until "images of the utter destruction and desperation – and criticism of the administration's response – began to appear on television." Trump dismissed the criticism, saying distribution of necessary supplies was "doing well". The Washington Post noted, "on the ground in Puerto Rico, nothing could be further from the truth." Trump cited Puerto Rico's remote location as an impediment to providing prompt relief, saying "This is an island surrounded by water. Big water. Ocean water." Trump also criticized Puerto Rico officials. A BMJ analysis found the federal government responded much more quickly and on a larger scale to the hurricane in Texas and Florida than in Puerto Rico, despite the fact that the hurricane in Puerto Rico was more severe. A 2021 HUD Inspector General investigation found that the Trump administration erected bureaucratic hurdles which stalled approximately $20 billion in hurricane relief for Puerto Rico.

At the time of FEMA's departure from Puerto Rico, one third of Puerto Rico residents still lacked electricity and some places lacked running water. A New England Journal of Medicine study estimated the number of hurricane-related deaths during the period September 20 to December 31, 2017, to be around 4,600 (range 793–8,498) The official death rate due to Maria reported by the Commonwealth of Puerto Rico is 2,975; the figure was based on an independent investigation by George Washington University commissioned by the governor of Puerto Rico. Trump falsely claimed the official death rate was wrong, and said the Democrats were trying to make him "look as bad as possible".

Puerto Rico Governor Ricardo Rosselló wrote that as he and Trump were in a helicopter surveying damage from the hurricane, Trump said, "Nature has a way of coming back. Well, it does until it does not. Who knows with nuclear warfare what will happen. But I tell you what. If nuclear war happens, we won't be second in line pressing the button." Citing insiders, Axios reported that Trump suggested using nuclear bombs to disintegrate hurricanes.Trump denied these reports. According to the NOAA, a nuclear bomb would barely affect a hurricane, which emits far more energy.

=== California wildfires ===
Trump misleadingly blamed the destructive wildfires in 2018 in California, on "gross" and "poor" "mismanagement" of forests by California, saying there was no other reason for these wildfires. The fires in question were not "forest fires"; most of the forest was owned by federal agencies; and climate change in part contributed to the fires. Trump mentioned Finland as a model, saying, "they spend a lot of time on raking and cleaning and doing things, and they don't have any problem. And when it is, it is a very small problem. So I know everybody is looking at that—to that end. And it's going to work out. It's going to work out well."

In September 2020, California's worst wildfires in history prompted Trump to visit the state. In a briefing to state officials, Trump said that federal assistance was necessary, and again baselessly asserted that the lack of forestry, not climate change, is the underlying cause of the fires.

== Economy ==
Economic indicators and federal finances under the Obama and Trump administrations $ represent U.S. trillions of unadjusted dollars
Year	Unemploy- ment	GDP	Real GDP growth	Fiscal data			
Year	Unemploy- ment	GDP	Real GDP growth	Receipts	Outlays	Deficit	Debt
ending	Dec 31 (calendar year)			Sep 30 (fiscal year)			
2016*	4.9%	$18.695	1.7%	$3.268	$3.853	– $0.585	$14.2
2017	4.4%	$19.480	2.3%	$3.316	$3.982	– $0.665	$14.7
2018	3.9%	$20.527	2.9%	$3.330	$4.109	– $0.779	$15.8
2019	3.7%	$21.373	2.3%	$3.463	$4.447	– $0.984	$16.8
2020	8.1%	$20.894	–3.4%	$3.421	$6.550	– $3.129	$21.0

Trump's economic policies have centered on cutting taxes, deregulation, and trade protectionism. Trump primarily stuck to or intensified traditional Republican economic policy positions that benefitted corporate interests or the affluent, with the exception of his trade protectionist policies. Deficit spending, combined with tax cuts for the wealthy, caused the U.S. national debt to sharply increase. Trump oversaw the third-biggest deficit growth (5.2% of GDP) of any president, behind only George W. Bush (11.7%) and Abraham Lincoln (9.4%).

One of Trump's first actions was to indefinitely suspend a cut in fee rates for federally-insured mortgages implemented by the Obama administration which saved individuals with lower credit scores around $500 per year on a typical loan. Upon taking office, Trump halted trade negotiations with the European Union on the Transatlantic Trade and Investment Partnership, which had been underway since 2013.

The administration proposed changes to the Supplemental Nutrition Assistance Program (food stamps), which if implemented would lead millions to lose access to food stamps and limit the amount of benefits for remaining recipients.

During his tenure, Trump repeatedly sought to intervene in the economy to affect specific companies and industries. Trump sought to compel power grid operators to buy coal and nuclear energy, and sought tariffs on metals to protect domestic metal producers. Trump also publicly attacked Boeing and Lockheed Martin, sending their stocks tumbling. Trump repeatedly singled out Amazon for criticism and advocated steps that would harm the company, such as ending an arrangement between Amazon and the United States Postal Service (USPS) and raising taxes on Amazon. Trump expressed opposition to the merger between Time Warner (the parent company of CNN) and AT&T.

The Trump campaign ran on a policy of reducing America's trade deficit, particularly with China. The overall trade deficit increased during Trump's presidency. The goods deficit with China reached a record high for the second consecutive year in 2018.

A 2021 study, which used the synthetic control method, found no evidence Trump had an impact on the U.S. economy during his time in office. Analysis conducted by Bloomberg News at the end of Trump's second year in office found that his economy ranked sixth among the last seven presidents, based on fourteen metrics of economic activity and financial performance. Trump repeatedly and falsely characterized the economy during his presidency as the best in American history.

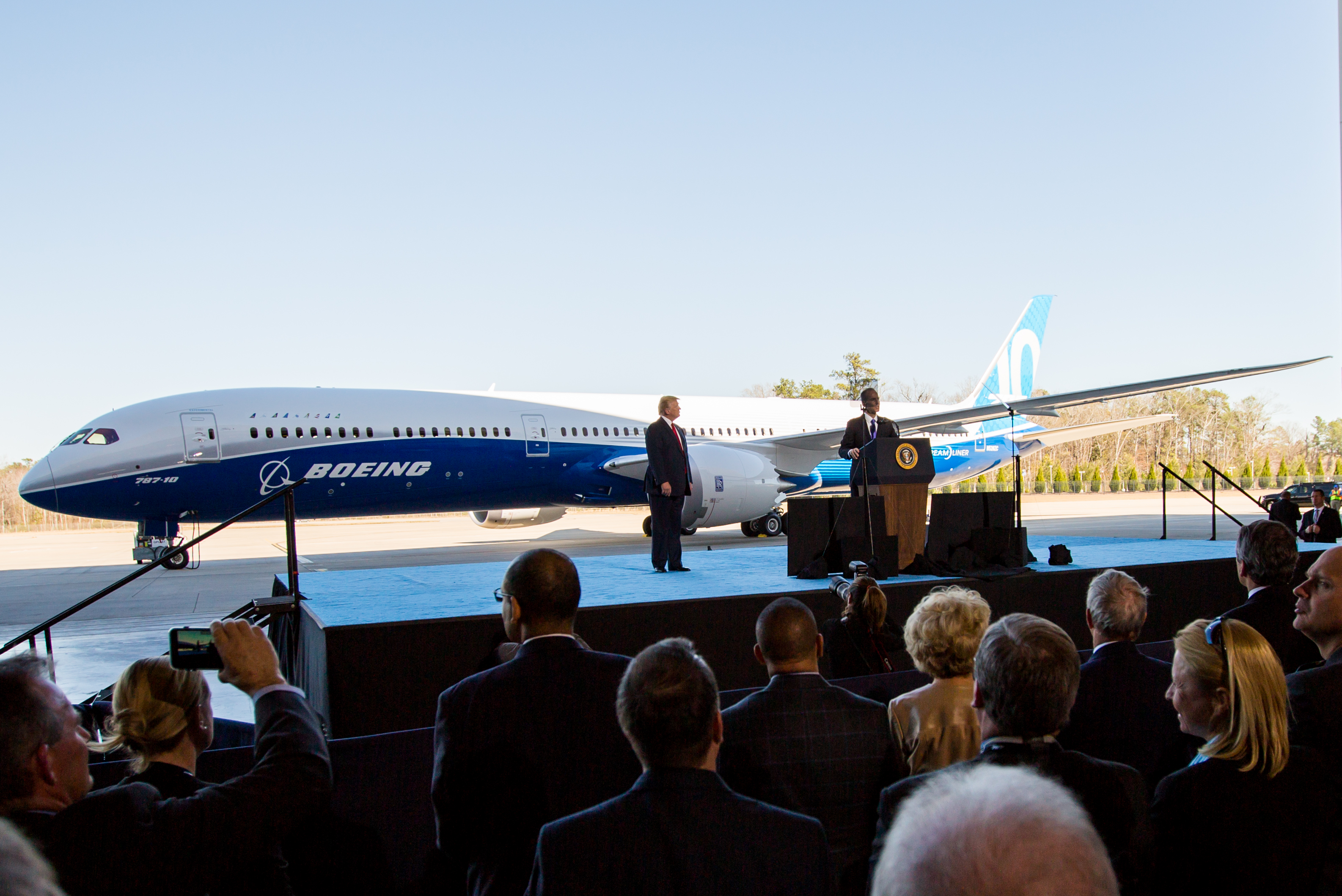
Trump and Boeing CEO Dennis Muilenburg at the 787-10 Dreamliner rollout ceremony

In February 2020, amid the COVID-19 pandemic, the U.S. entered a recession.

=== Taxation ===
In September 2017, Trump proposed the most sweeping federal tax overhaul in many years. Trump signed the tax legislation on December 22, 2017, after it passed Congress on party-line votes. The tax bill was the first major legislation signed by Trump. The $1.5 trillion bill reduced the corporate federal tax rate from 35% to 21%, its lowest point since 1939. The bill also cut the individual tax rate, reducing the top rate from 39.6% to 37%, although these individual tax cuts expire after 2025; as a result, "by 2027, every income group making less than $75,000 would see a net tax increase." The bill doubled the estate tax exemption (to $22 million for married couples); and allowed the owners of pass-through businesses to deduct 20% of business income. The bill doubled the standard deduction while eliminating many itemized deductions, including the deduction for state and local taxes. The bill also repealed the individual health insurance mandate contained in the Affordable Care Act.

According to The New York Times, the plan would result in a "huge windfall" for the very wealthy but would not benefit those in the bottom third of the income distribution. The nonpartisan Tax Policy Center estimated that the richest 0.1% and 1% would benefit the most in raw dollar amounts and percentage terms from the tax plan, earning 10.2% and 8.5% more income after taxes respectively. Middle-class households would on average earn 1.2% more after tax, but 13.5% of middle class households would see their tax burden increase. The poorest fifth of Americans would earn 0.5% more. Treasury Secretary Steven Mnuchin argued that the corporate income tax cut would benefit workers the most, while the nonpartisan Joint Committee on Taxation, the Congressional Budget Office and many economists estimated that owners of capital would benefit vastly more than workers. A preliminary estimate by the Committee for a Responsible Federal Budget found that the tax plan would add more than $2 trillion over the next decade to the federal debt, while the Tax Policy Center found that it would add $2.4 trillion to the debt. A 2019 Congressional Research Service analysis found that the tax cuts had "a relatively small (if any) first-year" growth effect on the economy. A 2019 analysis by the Committee for a Responsible Federal Budget concluded that Trump's policies will add $4.1 trillion to the national debt from 2017 to 2029. Around $1.8 trillion of debt is projected to eventually arise from the 2017 Tax Cuts and Jobs Act.

=== Trade ===
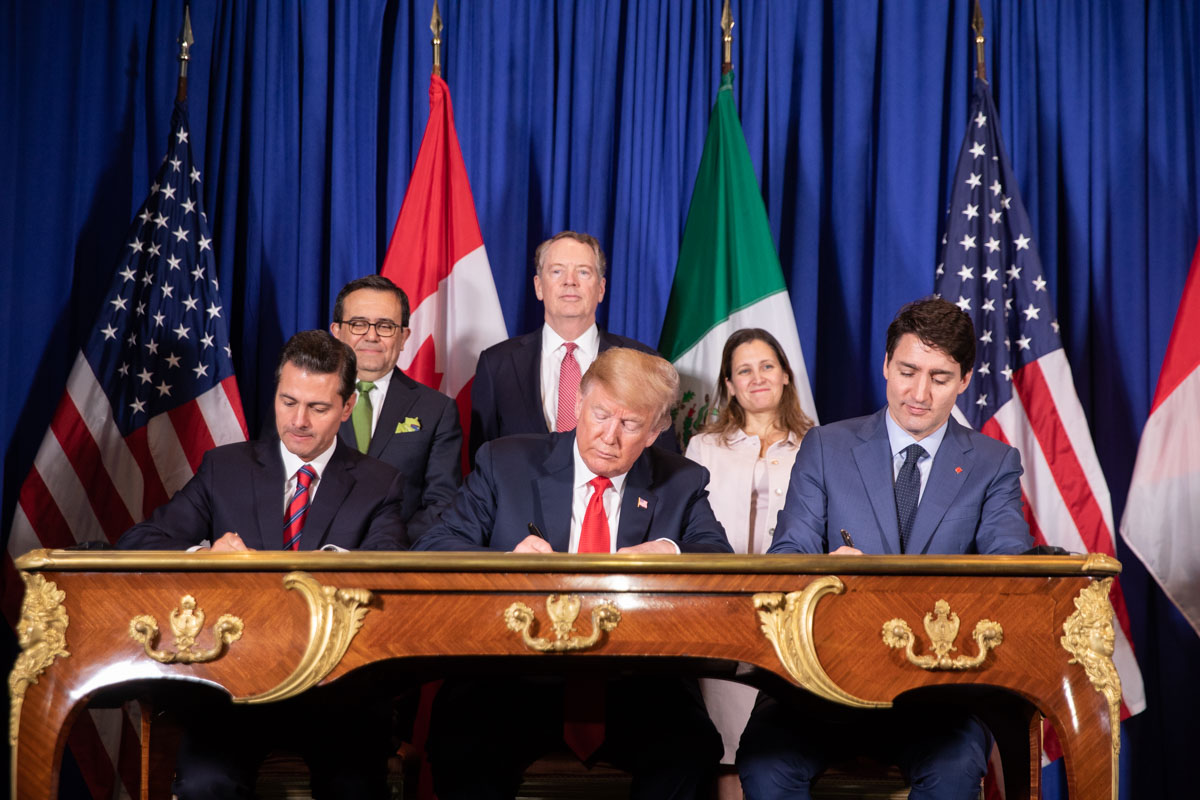
Trump signs the United States–Mexico–Canada Agreement (USMCA) alongside Mexican president Enrique Peña Nieto and Canadian prime minister Justin Trudeau in Buenos Aires, Argentina, November 30, 2018.

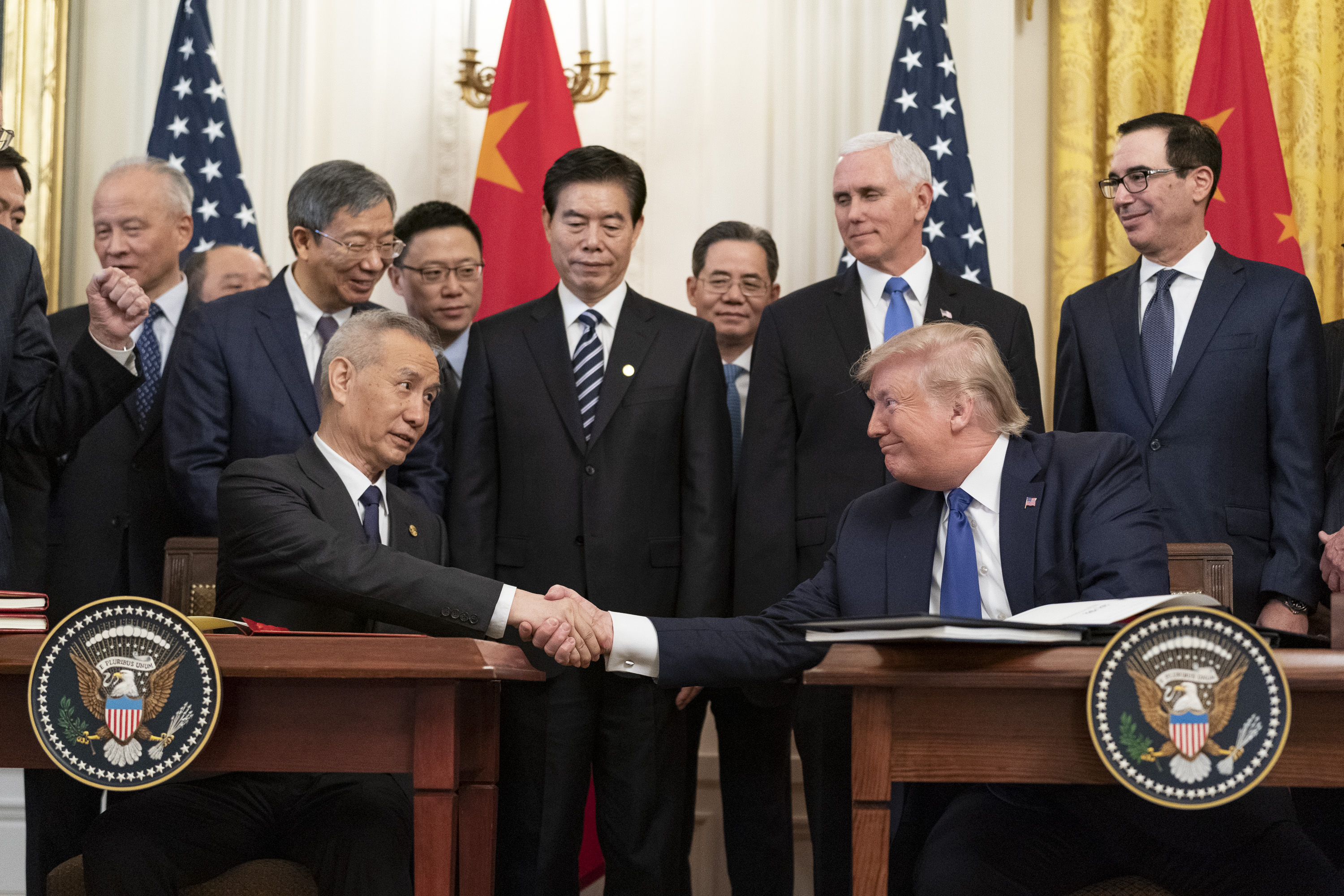
Trump and Chinese Vice Premier Liu He sign the Phase One Trade Deal, January 15, 2020.

In March 2018, Trump imposed tariffs on solar panels and washing machines of 30–50%. In March 2018, he imposed tariffs on steel (25%) and aluminum (10%) from most countries, which covered an estimated 4.1% of U.S. imports. On June 1, 2018, this was extended to the European Union, Canada, and Mexico. In separate moves, the Trump administration has set and escalated tariffs on goods imported from China, leading to a trade war. Trade advisor Peter Navarro was influential in pushing Trump to start a trade war with China. The tariffs angered trading partners, who implemented retaliatory tariffs on U.S. goods, and adversely affected real income and GDP. A CNBC analysis found that Trump "enacted tariffs equivalent to one of the largest tax increases in decades", while Tax Foundation and Tax Policy Center analyses found the tariffs could wipe out the benefits of the Tax Cuts and Jobs Act of 2017 for many households. The two countries reached a "phase one" truce agreement in January 2020. The bulk of the tariffs remained in place until talks were to resume after the 2020 election. Trump provided $28 billion in cash aid to farmers affected by the trade war. Studies have found that the tariffs also adversely affected Republican candidates in elections. An analysis published by The Wall Street Journal in October 2020 found the trade war did not achieve the primary objective of reviving American manufacturing, nor did it result in the reshoring of factory production.

Three weeks after Republican senator Chuck Grassley, chairman of the Senate Finance Committee, wrote an April 2019 Wall Street Journal op-ed entitled "Trump's Tariffs End or His Trade Deal Dies", stating "Congress won't approve USMCA while constituents pay the price for Mexican and Canadian retaliation," Trump lifted steel and aluminum tariffs on Mexico and Canada. Two weeks later, Trump unexpectedly announced he would impose a 5% tariff on all imports from Mexico on June 10, increasing to 10% on July 1, and by another 5% each month for three months, "until such time as illegal migrants coming through Mexico, and into our Country, STOP". Grassley commented the move as a "misuse of presidential tariff authority and counter to congressional intent". That same day, the Trump administration formally initiated the process to seek congressional approval of USMCA. Trump's top trade advisor, U.S. Trade Representative Robert Lighthizer, opposed the new Mexican tariffs on concerns it would jeopardize passage of USMCA. Treasury secretary Steven Mnuchin and Trump senior advisor Jared Kushner also opposed the action. Grassley, whose committee is instrumental in passing USMCA, was not informed in advance of Trump's surprise announcement. On June 7, Trump announced the tariffs would be "indefinitely suspended" after Mexico agreed to take actions, including deploying its National Guard throughout the country and along its southern border. The New York Times reported the following day that Mexico had actually agreed to most of the actions months earlier.

As a presidential candidate in 2016, Trump pledged to withdraw from the Trans-Pacific Partnership, a trade agreement with eleven Pacific Rim nations which the United States had signed earlier that year. China was not a party to the agreement, which was intended to allow the United States to guide trade relations in the region. He incorrectly asserted the deal was flawed because it contained a "back door" that would allow China to enter the agreement later. Trump announced the American withdrawal from the deal days after taking office. Upon the American withdrawal, the remaining partners renamed it the Comprehensive and Progressive Agreement for Trans-Pacific Partnership. In September 2021, China formally applied to join that agreement in an effort to replace the United States as its hub; China's state-run Global Times said the move would "cement the country's leadership in global trade" and leave the United States "increasingly isolated."

== Education ==
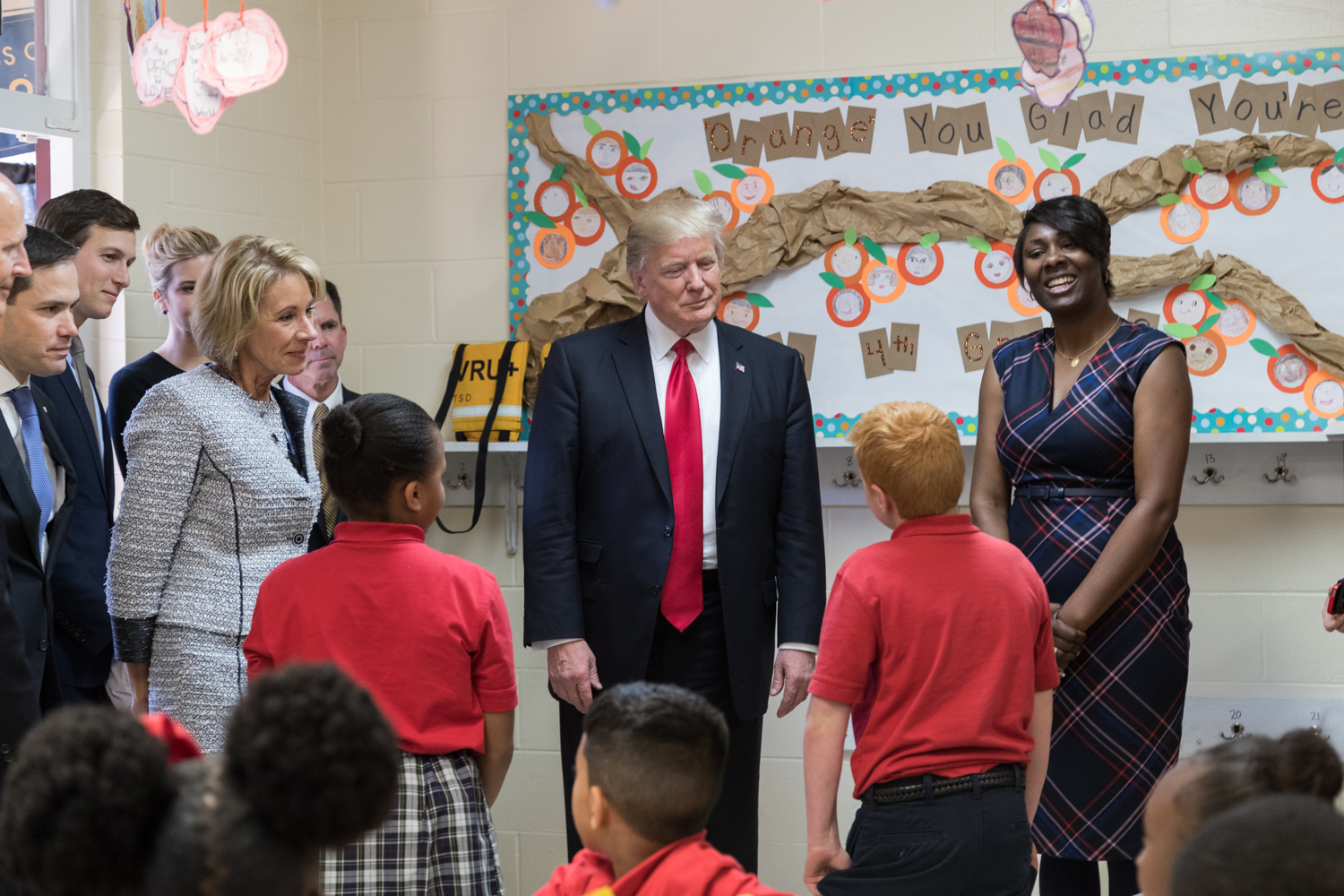
Trump and Secretary of Education Betsy DeVos visit Saint Andrew's Catholic School in Orlando, Florida, March 3, 2017.

Trump appointed Betsy DeVos as his secretary of education. Her nomination was confirmed on a 50–50 Senate vote with Vice President Pence called upon to break the tie (the first time a vice president had cast a tie-breaking vote on a Cabinet nomination). Democrats opposed DeVos as underqualified, while Republicans supported DeVos because of her strong support of school choice.

In 2017, Trump revoked an Obama administration memo which provided protections for people in default on student loans. The United States Department of Education cancelled agreements with the Consumer Financial Protection Bureau (CFPB) to police student loan fraud. The administration rescinded a regulation restricting federal funding to for-profit colleges unable to demonstrate that college graduates had a reasonable debt-to-earnings ratio after entering the job market. Seth Frotman, the CFPB student loan ombudsman, resigned, accusing the Trump administration of undermining the CFPB's work on protecting student borrowers. DeVos marginalized an investigative unit within the Department of Education that under Obama investigated predatory activities by for-profit colleges. An investigation started under Obama into the practices of DeVry Education Group, which operates for-profit colleges, was halted in early 2017, and the former dean at DeVry was made into the supervisor for the investigative unit later that summer. DeVry paid a $100 million fine in 2016 for defrauding students.

In 2017, the administration reversed an Obama administration guidance on how schools and universities should combat sexual harassment and sexual violence.

== Election integrity ==
On the eve of the 2018 midterm elections, Politico described the Trump administration's efforts to combat election propaganda as "rudderless". At the same time, U.S. intelligence agencies warned about "ongoing campaigns" by Russia, China, and Iran to influence American elections.

== Energy ==
The administration's "America First Energy Plan" did not mention renewable energy and instead focused on fossil fuels. The administration enacted 30% tariffs on imported solar panels. The American solar energy industry is highly reliant on foreign parts (80% of parts are made abroad); as a result, the tariffs could raise the costs of solar energy, reduce innovation and reduce jobs in the industry – which in 2017 employed nearly four times as many American workers as the coal industry. The administration reversed standards put in place to make commonly used lightbulbs more energy-efficient.

Trump rescinded a rule requiring oil, gas and mining firms to disclose how much they paid foreign governments, and withdrew from the international Extractive Industries Transparency Initiative (EITI) which required disclosure of payments by oil, gas and mining companies to governments.

In 2017, Trump ordered the reversal of an Obama-era ban on new oil and gas leasing in the Arctic Ocean and environmentally sensitive areas of the North Atlantic coast, in the Outer Continental Shelf. Trump's order was halted by a federal court, which ruled in 2019 that it unlawfully exceeded his authority. Trump also revoked the 2016 Well Control Rule, a safety regulation adopted after the Deepwater Horizon oil spill; this action is the subject of legal challenges from environmental groups.

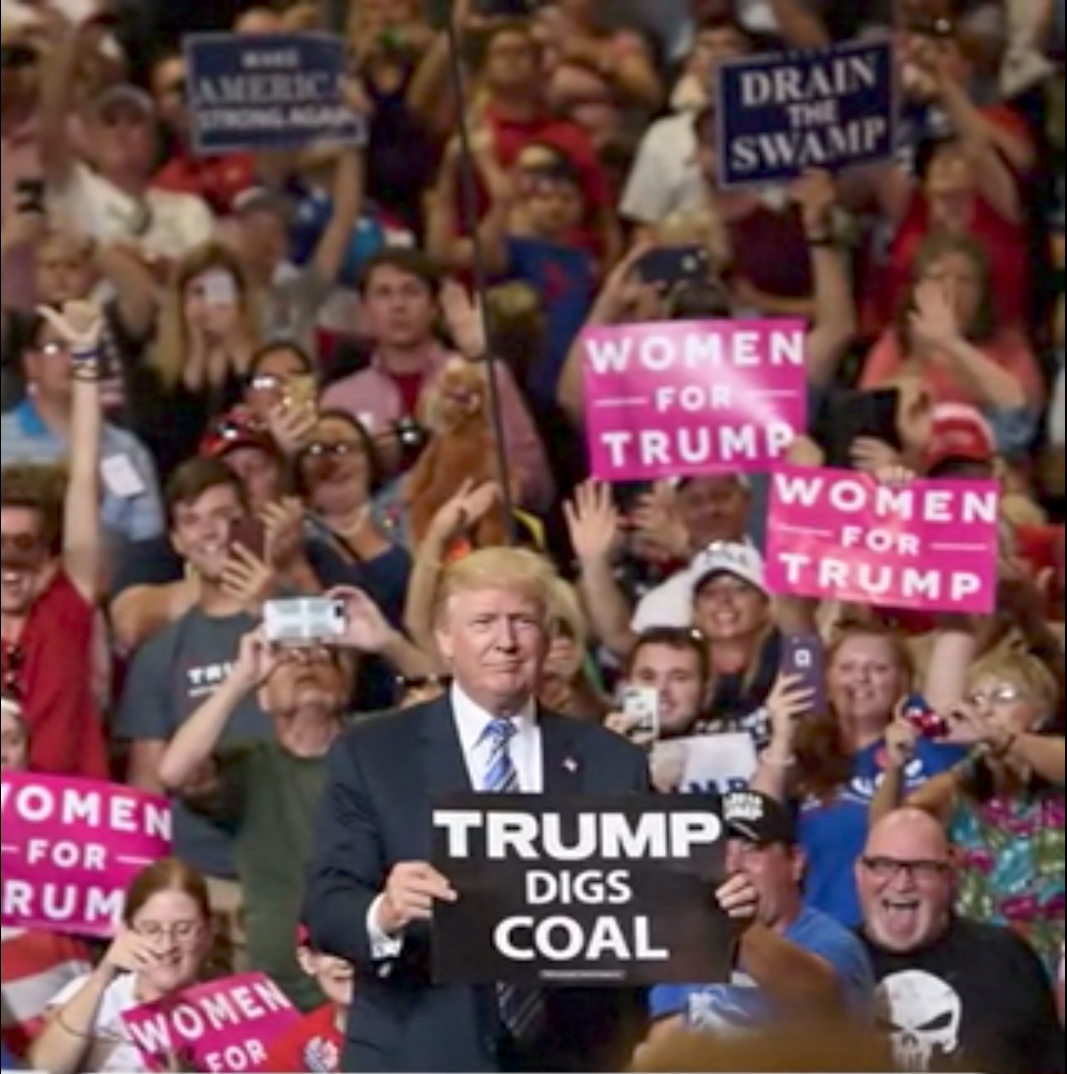
April 2017 Trump rally in Harrisburg, Pennsylvania

In January 2018, the administration singled out Florida for exemption from the administration's offshore drilling plan. The move stirred controversy because it came after Florida governor Rick Scott, who was considering a 2018 Senate run, complained about the plan. The move raised ethical questions about the appearance of "transactional favoritism" because Trump owns a coastal resort in Florida, and because of the state's status as a crucial "swing state" in the 2020 presidential election. Other states sought similar offshore drilling exemptions, and litigation ensued.

Despite rhetoric about boosting the coal industry, coal-fueled electricity generating capacity declined faster during Trump's presidency than during any previous presidential term, falling 15% with the idling of 145 coal-burning units at 75 power plants. An estimated 20% of electricity was expected to be generated by coal in 2020, compared to 31% in 2017.

== Environment ==
By October 2020, the administration had overturned 72 environmental regulations and was in process of reversing an additional 27. A 2018 American Journal of Public Health study found that in Trump's first six months in office, the United States Environmental Protection Agency adopted a pro-business attitude unlike that of any previous administration, as it "moved away from the public interest and explicitly favored the interests of the regulated industries".

Analyses of EPA enforcement data showed that the Trump administration brought fewer cases against polluters, sought a lower total of civil penalties and made fewer requests of companies to retrofit facilities to curb pollution than the Obama and Bush administrations. According to The New York Times, "confidential internal E.P.A. documents show that the enforcement slowdown coincides with major policy changes ordered by Mr. Pruitt's team after pleas from oil and gas industry executives." In 2018, the administration referred the lowest number of pollution cases for criminal prosecution in 30 years. Two years into Trump's presidency, The New York Times wrote he had "unleashed a regulatory rollback, lobbied for and cheered on by industry, with little parallel in the past half-century". In June 2018, David Cutler and Francesca Dominici of Harvard University estimated conservatively that the Trump administration's modifications to environmental rules could result in more than 80,000 additional U.S. deaths and widespread respiratory ailments. In August 2018, the administration's own analysis showed that loosening coal plant rules could cause up to 1,400 premature deaths and 15,000 new cases of respiratory problems. From 2016 to 2018, air pollution increased by 5.5%, reversing a seven-year trend where air pollution had declined by 25%.

All references to climate change were removed from the White House website, with the sole exception of mentioning Trump's intention to eliminate the Obama administration's climate change policies. The EPA removed climate change material on its website, including detailed climate data. In June 2017, Trump announced U.S. withdrawal from the Paris Agreement, a 2015 climate change accord reached by 200 nations to cut greenhouse gas emissions. In December 2017, Trump – who had repeatedly called scientific consensus on climate a "hoax" before becoming president – falsely implied that cold weather meant climate change was not occurring. Through executive order, Trump reversed multiple Obama administration policies meant to tackle climate change, such as a moratorium on federal coal leasing, the Presidential Climate Action Plan, and guidance for federal agencies on taking climate change into account during National Environmental Policy Act action reviews. Trump also ordered reviews and possibly modifications to several directives, such as the Clean Power Plan (CPP), the estimate for the "social cost of carbon" emissions, carbon dioxide emission standards for new coal plants, methane emissions standards from oil and natural gas extraction, as well as any regulations inhibiting domestic energy production. The administration rolled back regulations requiring the federal government to account for climate change and sea-level rise when building infrastructure. The EPA disbanded a 20-expert panel on pollution which advised the EPA on the appropriate threshold levels to set for air quality standards.

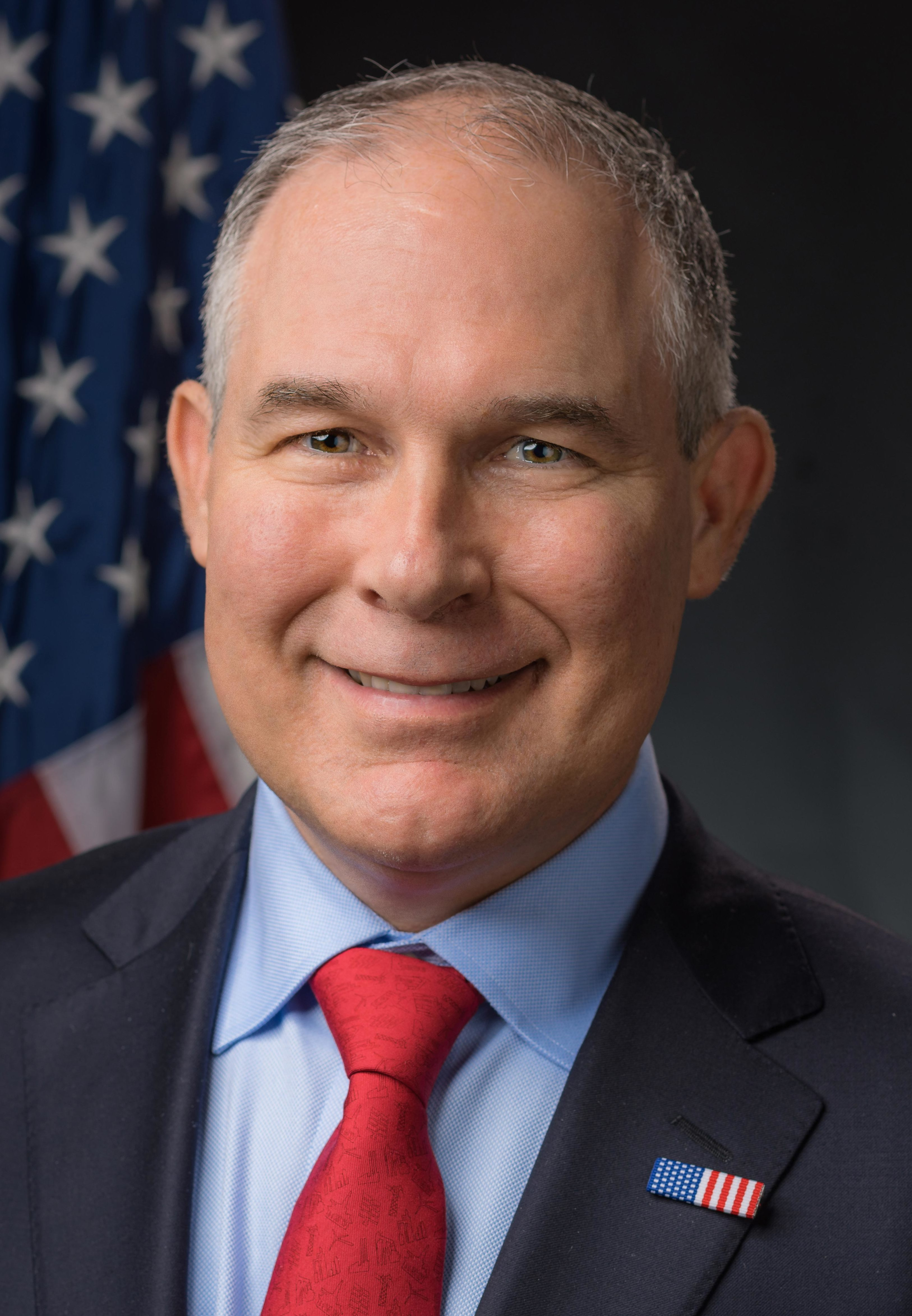
Official portrait of Scott Pruitt as EPA Administrator

The administration has repeatedly sought to reduce the EPA budget. The administration invalidated the Stream Protection Rule, which limited dumping of toxic wastewater containing metals, such as arsenic and mercury, into public waterways, regulations on coal ash (carcinogenic leftover waste produced by coal plants), and an Obama-era executive order on protections for oceans, coastlines and lakes enacted in response to the Deepwater Horizon oil spill. The administration refused to act on recommendations from EPA scientists urging greater regulation of particulate pollution.

The administration rolled back major Clean Water Act protections, narrowing the definition of the "waters of the United States" under federal protection. Studies by the Obama-era EPA suggest that up to two-thirds of California's inland freshwater streams would lose protections under the rule change. The EPA sought to repeal a regulation which required oil and gas companies to restrict emissions of methane, a potent greenhouse gas. The EPA rolled back automobile fuel efficiency standards introduced in 2012. The EPA granted a loophole allowing a small set of trucking companies to skirt emissions rules and produce glider trucks that emit 40 to 55 times the air pollutants of other new trucks. The EPA rejected a ban on the toxic pesticide chlorpyrifos; a federal court then ordered the EPA to ban chlorpyrifos, because the EPA's own extensive research showed it caused adverse health effects in children. The administration scaled back the ban on the use of the solvent methylene chloride, and lifted a rule requiring major farms to report pollution emitted through animal waste.

The administration suspended funding on several environmental research studies, a multi-million-dollar program that distributed grants for research the effects of chemical exposure on children and $10-million-a-year research line for NASA's Carbon Monitoring System. including an unsuccessful attempt to kill aspects of NASA's climate science program.

The EPA expedited the process for approving new chemicals and made the process of evaluating the safety of those chemicals less stringent; EPA scientists expressed concerns that the agency's ability to stop hazardous chemicals was being compromised. Internal emails showed that Pruitt aides prevented the publication of a health study showing some toxic chemicals endanger humans at far lower levels than the EPA previously characterized as safe. One such chemical was present in high quantities around several military bases, including groundwater. The nondisclosure of the study and the delay in public knowledge of the findings may have prevented the government from updating the infrastructure at the bases and individuals who lived near the bases to avoid the tap water.

The administration weakened enforcement the Endangered Species Act, making it easier to start mining, drilling and construction projects in areas with endangered and threatened species. The administration has actively discouraged local governments and businesses from undertaking preservation efforts.

The administration sharply reduced the size of two national monuments in Utah by approximately two million acres, making it the largest reduction of public land protections in American history. Shortly afterwards, Interior Secretary Ryan Zinke advocated for downsizing four additional national monuments and changing the way six additional monuments were managed. In 2019, the administration sped up the process for environmental reviews for oil and gas drilling in the Arctic; experts said the speeding up made reviews less comprehensive and reliable. According to Politico, the administration sped up the process in the event that a Democratic administration was elected in 2020, which would have halted new oil and gas leases in the Arctic National Wildlife Refuge. The administration sought to open up more than 180,000 acres of the Tongass National Forest in Alaska, the largest in the country, for logging.

In April 2018, Pruitt announced a policy change prohibiting EPA regulators from considering scientific research unless the raw data of the research was made publicly available. This would limit EPA regulators' use of much environmental research, given that participants in many such studies provide personal health information which is kept confidential. The EPA cited two bipartisan reports and various nonpartisan studies about the use of science in government to defend the decision. However, the authors of those reports dismissed that the EPA followed their instructions, with one author saying, "They don't adopt any of our recommendations, and they go in a direction that's opposite, completely different. They don't adopt any of the recommendations of any of the sources they cite."

In July 2020, Trump moved to weaken the National Environmental Policy Act by limiting public review to speed up permitting. In August 2020, Trump signed the Great American Outdoors Act to fully fund the Land and Water Conservation Fund. He had intended to oppose the bill and gut the fund until Republican senators afraid of losing their reelection bids and the Senate majority changed his mind.

== Government size and regulations ==
The administration imposed far fewer financial penalties against banks and major companies accused of wrongdoing relative to the Obama administration.

In the first six weeks of his tenure, Trump suspended – or in a few cases, revoked – more than 90 regulations. In early 2017, Trump signed an executive order directing federal agencies to slash two existing regulations for every new one (without spending on regulations going up). A September 2017 Bloomberg BNA review found that due to unclear wording in the order and the large proportion of regulations it exempts, the order had had little effect since it was signed. The Trump OMB released an analysis in February 2018 indicating the economic benefits of regulations significantly outweigh the economic costs. The administration ordered one-third of government advisory committees for federal agencies eliminated, except for committees that evaluate consumer product safety or committees that approve research grants.

Trump ordered a four-month government-wide hiring freeze of the civilian work force (excluding staff in the military, national security, public safety and offices of new presidential appointees) at the start of his term. He said he did not intend to fill many of the governmental positions that were still vacant, as he considered them unnecessary; there were nearly 2,000 vacant government positions.

The administration ended the requirement that nonprofits, including political advocacy groups who collect so-called dark money, disclose the names of large donors to the IRS; the Senate voted to overturn the administration's rule change.

== Guns ==
The administration banned bump stocks after such devices were used by the gunman who perpetrated the 2017 Las Vegas shooting. In the wake of several mass shootings during the Trump administration, including August 2019 shootings in El Paso, Texas, and Dayton, Ohio, Trump called on states to implement red flag laws to remove guns from "those judged to pose a grave risk to public safety". By November 2019, he abandoned the idea of red-flag laws. Trump repealed a regulation that barred gun ownership from approximately 75,000 individuals who received Social Security checks due to mental illness and who were deemed unfit to handle their financial affairs. The administration ended U.S. involvement in the UN Arms Trade Treaty to curb the international trade of conventional arms with countries having poor human rights records.

== Health care ==
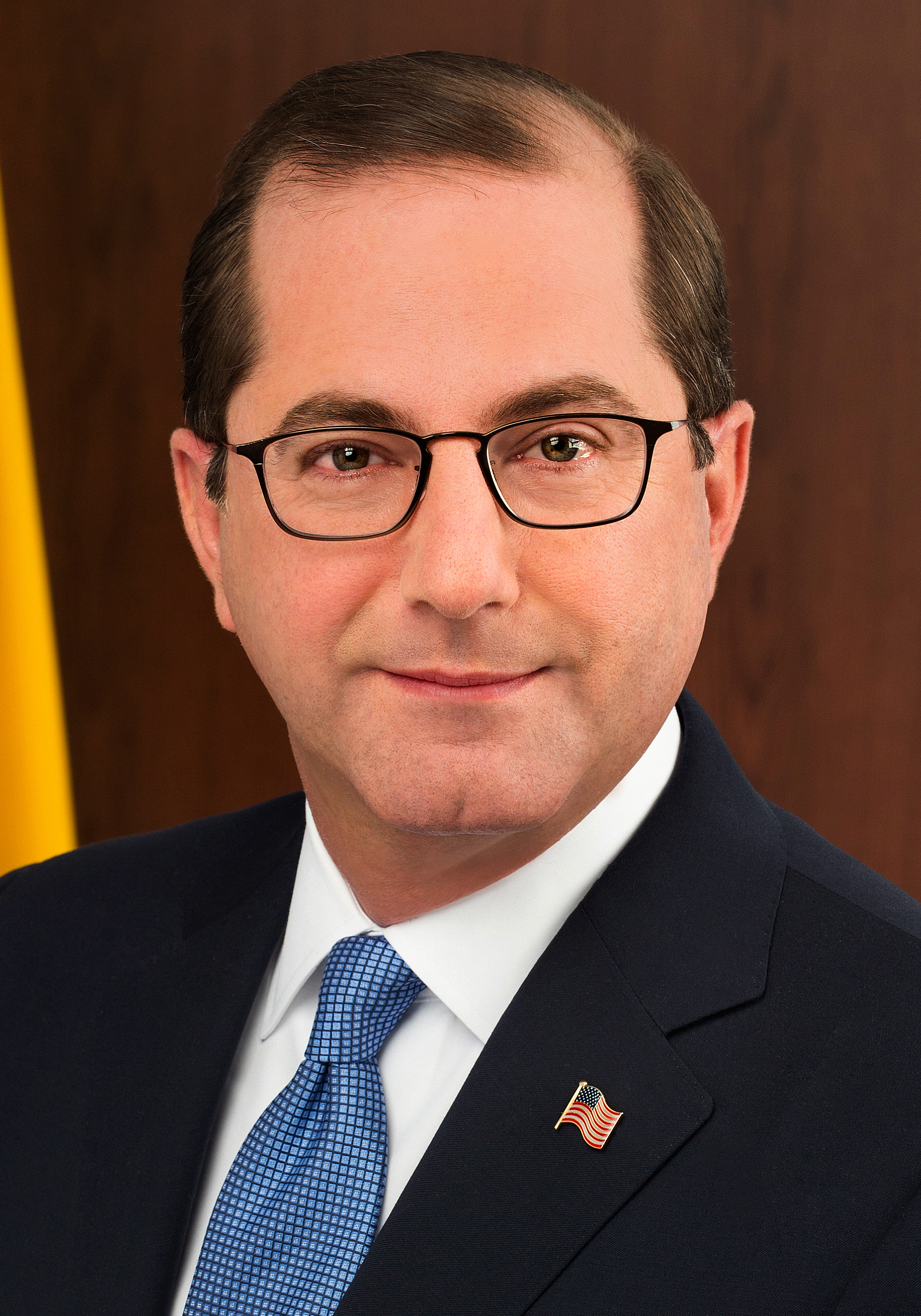
HHS Secretary Alex Azar

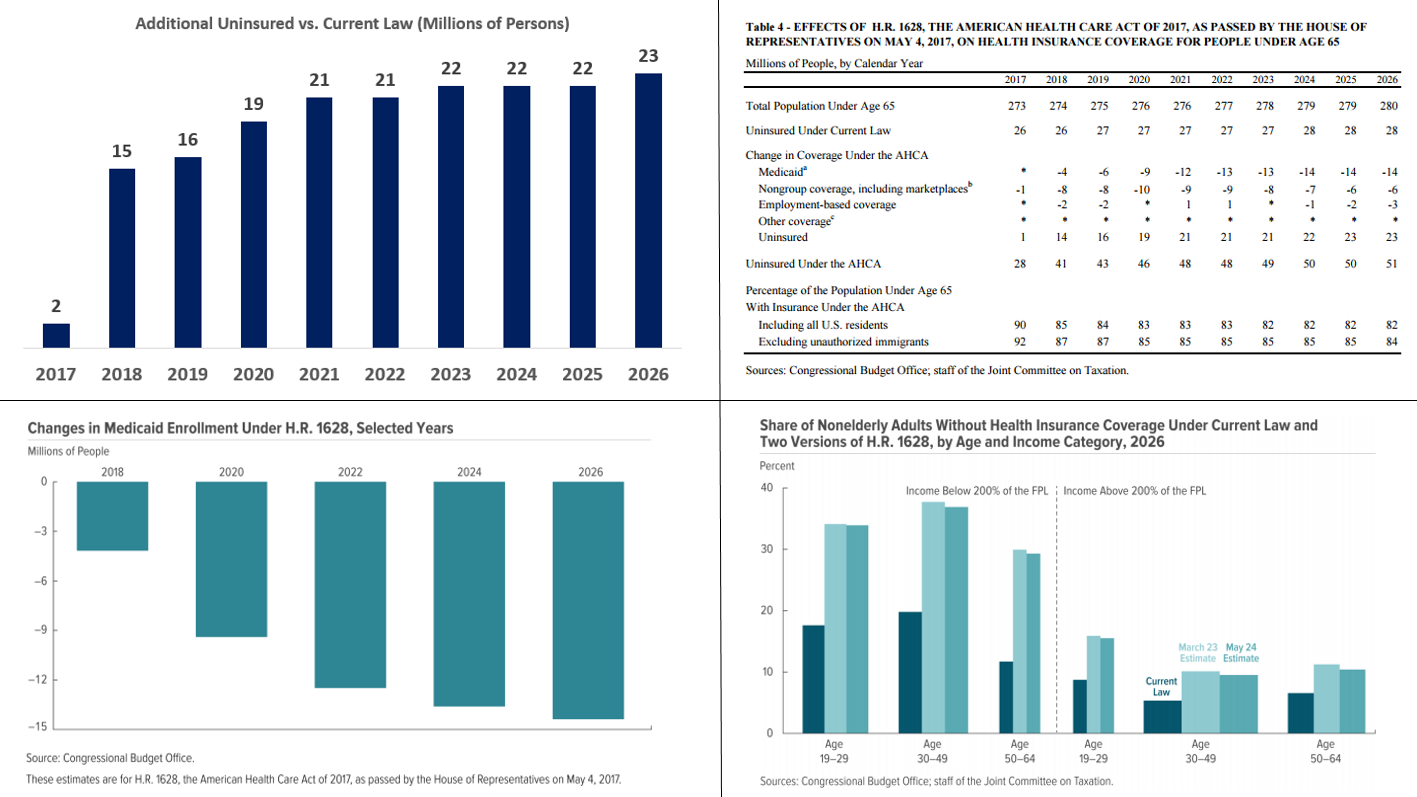
The CBO estimated in May 2017 that the Republican AHCA would reduce the number of people with health insurance by 23 million during 2026, relative to current law.

The 2010 Affordable Care Act (also known as "Obamacare" or the ACA) elicited major opposition from the Republican Party from its inception, and Trump called for a repeal of the law during the 2016 election campaign. On taking office, Trump promised to pass a healthcare bill that would cover everyone and result in better and less expensive insurance. Throughout his presidency, Trump repeatedly asserted that his administration and Republicans in Congress supported protections for individuals with preexisting conditions; however, fact-checkers noted the administration supported attempts both in Congress and in the courts to roll back the ACA (and its protections for preexisting conditions).

Congressional Republicans made two serious efforts to repeal the ACA. First, in March 2017, Trump endorsed the American Health Care Act (AHCA), a Republican bill to repeal and replace the ACA. Opposition from several House Republicans, both moderate and conservative, led to the defeat of this version of the bill. Second in May 2017, the House narrowly voted in favor of a new version of the AHCA to repeal the ACA, sending the bill to the Senate for deliberation. Over the next weeks the Senate made several attempts to create a repeal bill; however, all the proposals were ultimately rejected in a series of Senate votes in late July. The individual mandate was repealed in December 2017 by the Tax Cuts and Jobs Act. The Congressional Budget Office estimated in May 2018 that repealing the individual mandate would increase the number of uninsured by eight million and that individual healthcare insurance premiums had increased by ten percent between 2017 and 2018. In June 2018, the Trump administration, joining 18 Republican-led states, unsuccessfully argued to the Supreme Court in California v. Texas that the elimination of the financial penalties associated with the individual mandate had rendered the act unconstitutional, which would have eliminated health insurance coverage for up to 23 million Americans.

Trump repeatedly expressed a desire to "let Obamacare fail", and the Trump administration undermined Obamacare through various actions. The open enrollment period was cut from twelve weeks to six, the advertising budget for enrollment was cut by 90%, and organizations helping people shop for coverage got 39% less money. The CBO found that ACA enrollment at health care exchanges would be lower than its previous forecasts due to the Trump administration's undermining of the ACA. A 2019 study found that enrollment into the ACA during the Trump administration's first year was nearly thirty percent lower than during 2016. The CBO found that insurance premiums would rise sharply in 2018 due to the Trump administration's refusal to commit to continuing paying ACA subsidies, which added uncertainty to the insurance market and led insurers to raise premiums for fear they will not get subsidized.

The administration ended subsidy payments to health insurance companies, in a move expected to raise premiums in 2018 for middle-class families by an average of about twenty percent nationwide and cost the federal government nearly $200 billion more than it saved over a ten-year period. The administration made it easier for businesses to use health insurance plans not covered by several of the ACA's protections, including for preexisting conditions, and allowed organizations not to cover birth control. In justifying the action, the administration made false claims about the health harms of contraceptives.

The administration proposed substantial spending cuts to Medicare, Medicaid and Social Security Disability Insurance. Trump had previously vowed to protect Medicare and Medicaid. The administration reduced enforcement of penalties against nursing homes that harm residents. As a candidate and throughout his presidency, Trump said he would cut the costs of pharmaceuticals. During his first seven months in office, there were 96 price hikes for every drug price cut. Abandoning a promise he made as candidate, Trump announced he would not allow Medicare to use its bargaining power to negotiate lower drug prices.

=== Reproductive rights ===
Trump reinstated the Mexico City policy, also known as the global gag rule, prohibiting funding to foreign nongovernmental organizations that perform abortions as a method of family planning in other countries. The administration implemented a policy restricting taxpayer dollars given to family planning facilities that mention abortion to patients, provide abortion referrals, or share space with abortion providers. As a result, Planned Parenthood, which provides Title X birth control services to 1.5 million women, withdrew from the program. Throughout his presidency, Trump pressed for a ban on late-term abortions and made frequent false claims about them.

In 2018, the administration prohibited scientists at the National Institutes of Health (NIH) from acquiring new fetal tissue for research, and a year later stopped all medical research by government scientists that used fetal tissue.

The administration geared HHS funding towards abstinence education programs for teens rather than the comprehensive sexual education programs the Obama administration funded.

Trump's Supreme Court nominees, Neil Gorsuch, Brett Kavanaugh, and Amy Coney Barrett voted to overturn Roe v. Wade and Planned Parenthood v. Casey in Dobbs v. Jackson Women's Health Organization. Trump took credit for the decision, which threw abortion rights back to the states.

=== Opioid epidemic ===
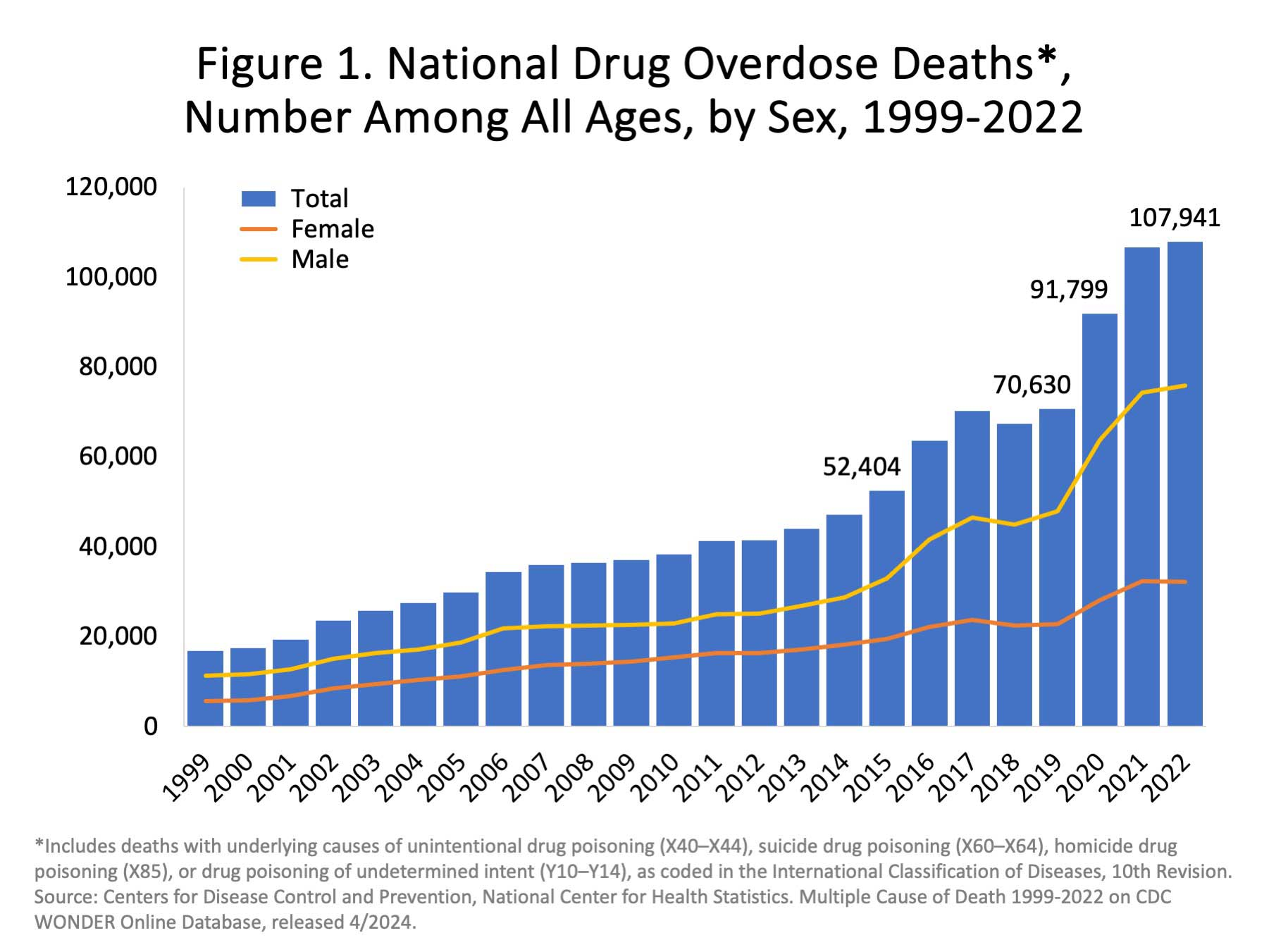
Drug overdoses in the U.S. 1999-2022

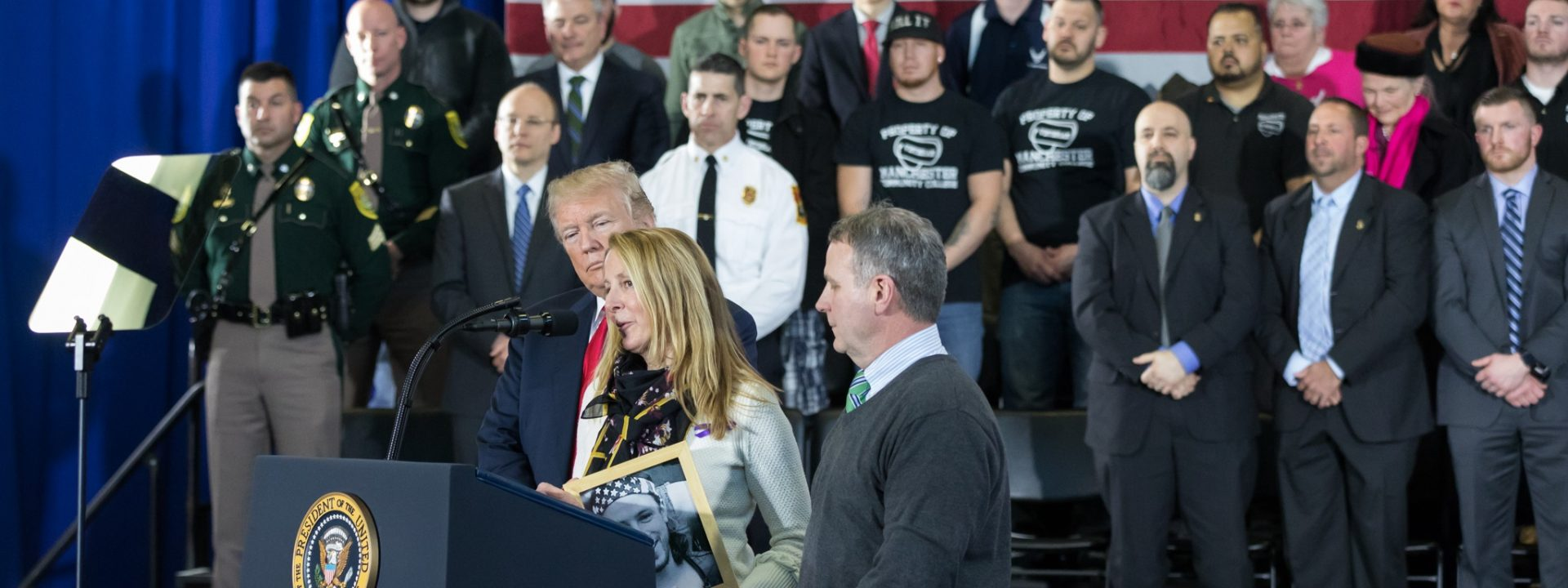
Trump at the 15th Annual Opioid Takeback Day

Trump nominated Tom Marino to become the nation's drug czar but the nomination was withdrawn after an investigation found he had been the chief architect of a bill that crippled the enforcement powers of the Drug Enforcement Administration and worsened the opioid crisis.

Kellyanne Conway led White House efforts to combat the opioid epidemic; Conway had no experience or expertise on matters of public health, substance abuse, or law enforcement. Conway sidelined drug experts and opted instead for the use of political staff. Politico wrote in 2018 that the administration's "main response" to the opioid crisis "so far has been to call for a border wall and to promise a 'just say no' campaign".

In October 2017, the administration declared a 90-day public health emergency over the opioid epidemic and pledged to urgently mobilize the federal government in response to the crisis. On January 11, 2018, twelve days before the declaration ran out, Politico noted that "beyond drawing more attention to the crisis, virtually nothing of consequence has been done." The administration had not proposed any new resources or spending, had not started the promised advertising campaign to spread awareness about addiction, and had yet to fill key public health and drug positions in the administration. One of the top officials at the Office of National Drug Control Policy, which is tasked with multi-billion-dollar anti-drug initiatives and curbing the opioid epidemic, was a 24-year old campaign staffer from the Trump 2016 campaign who lied on his CV and whose stepfather went to jail for manufacturing illegal drugs; after the administration was contacted about the official's qualifications and CV, the administration gave him a job with different tasks.

=== COVID-19 pandemic ===
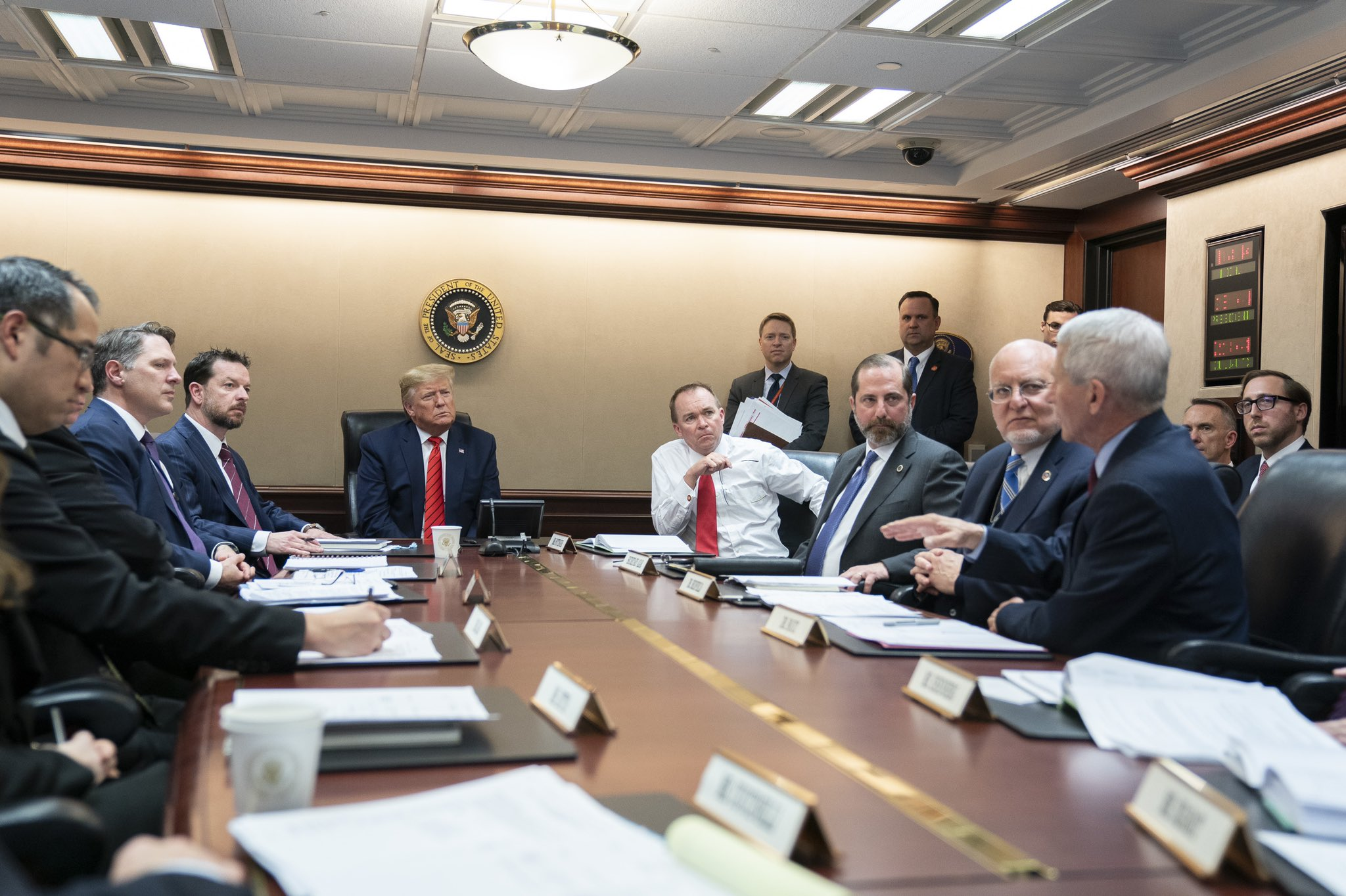
Trump receives a briefing on COVID-19 in the White House Situation Room.

In 2018, before the COVID-19 pandemic, the Trump administration reorganized the Global Health Security and Biodefense unit at the NSC by merging it with other related units. Two months prior to the outbreak in Wuhan China, the Trump Administration had cut nearly $200 million in funding to Chinese research scientists studying animal coronaviruses. Throughout his presidency he also proposed budget cuts to global health. The Trump administration ignored detailed plans on how to mass-produce protective respirator masks under a program that had been launched by the Obama administration to alleviate a mask shortage for a future pandemic.

From January to mid-March 2020, Trump consistently downplayed the threat posed by COVID-19 to the United States, giving many optimistic public statements. He accused Democrats and media outlets of exaggerating the seriousness of the situation, describing Democrats' criticism of his administration's response as a "hoax". By March 2020, however, Trump had adopted a more somber tone on the matter, acknowledging for the first time that COVID-19 was "not under control". Although the CDC recommended people wear face masks in public when social distancing is not possible, Trump continually refused to wear one. He praised and encouraged protesters who violated stay-at-home orders in Democratic states, as well as praised Republican governors who violated the White House's own COVID-19 guidelines regarding reopening their economies.

The White House Coronavirus Task Force was led by Vice President Mike Pence, Coronavirus Response Coordinator Deborah Birx, and Trump's son-in-law Jared Kushner. Congress appropriated $8.3 billion in emergency funding, which Trump signed into law on March 6. During his oval office address on March 11, Trump announced an imminent travel ban between Europe and the U.S. The announcement caused chaos in European and American airports, as Americans abroad scrambled to get flights back to the U.S. The administration later had to clarify that the travel ban applied to foreigners coming from the Schengen Area, and later added Ireland and the UK to the list. Previously, in late January 2020, the administration banned travel to the U.S. from China; prior to the decision, major U.S. carriers had already announced that they would no longer fly to and from China. On March 13, Trump designated COVID-19 pandemic as a national emergency, as the number of known cases of COVID-19 in the country exceeded 1,500, while known deaths exceeded 40.

Although the U.S. government was initially quick to develop a diagnostic test for COVID-19, U.S. COVID-19 testing efforts from mid-January to late-February lost pace compared to the rest of the world. ABC News described the testing as "shockingly slow". When the WHO distributed 1.4 million COVID-19 tests in February, the U.S. chose instead to use its own tests. At that time, the CDC had produced 160,000 COVID-19 tests, but many were defective. As a result, fewer than 4,000 tests were done in the U.S. by February 27, with U.S. state laboratories conducting only about 200. In this period, academic laboratories and hospitals had developed their own tests, but were not allowed to use them until February 29, when the Food and Drug Administration issued approvals for them and private companies. A comprehensive New York Times investigation concluded that "technical flaws, regulatory hurdles, business-as-usual bureaucracies and lack of leadership at multiple levels" contributed to the testing failures. An Associated Press investigation found the administration made its first bulk orders for vital health care equipment, such as N95 respirator masks and ventilators, in mid-March.

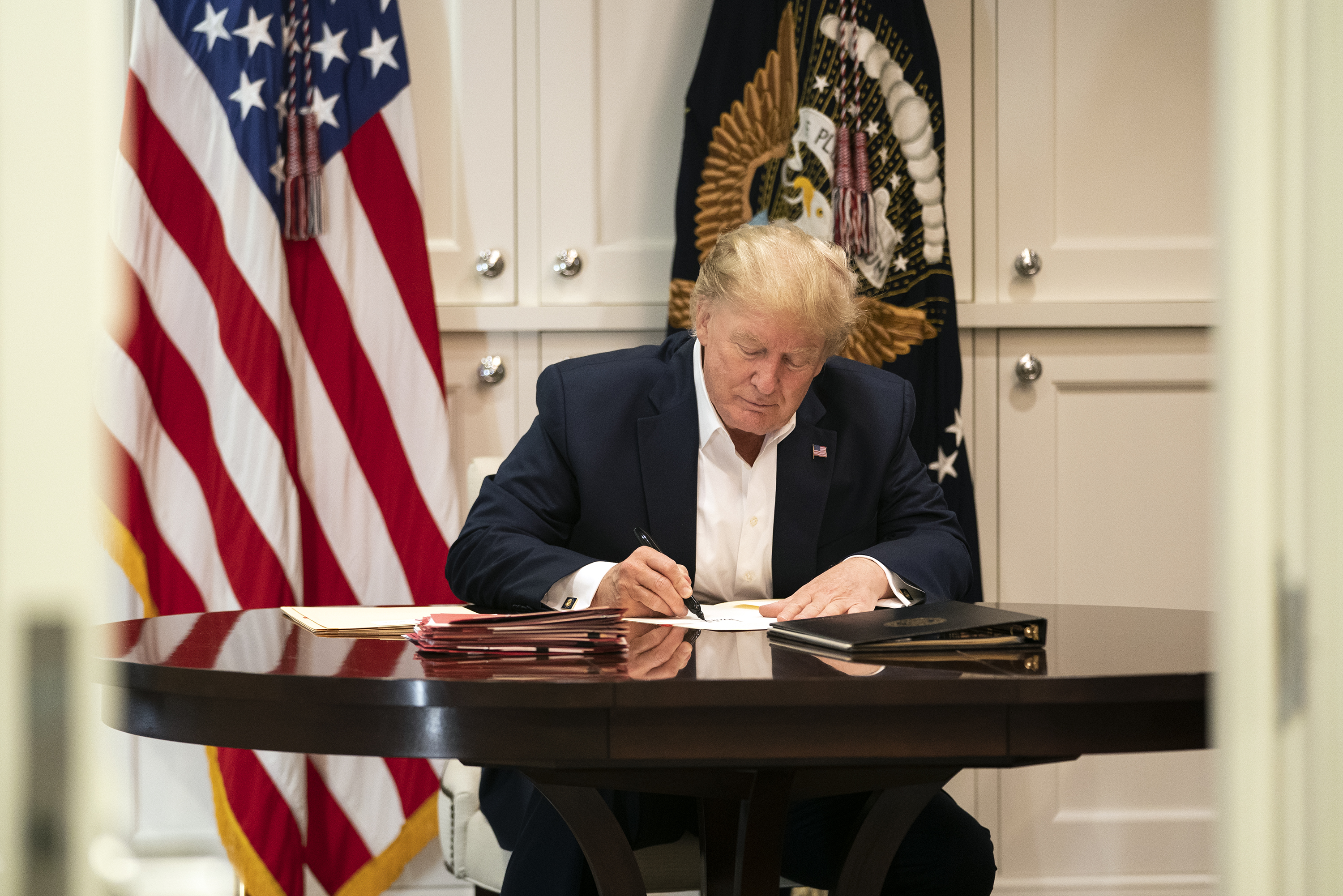
Trump was hospitalized at the Walter Reed National Military Medical Center following his COVID-19 diagnosis on October 3, 2020.

On March 26, the U.S. became the country with the highest number of confirmed COVID-19 infections, with over 82,000 cases. On April 11, the U.S. became the country with the highest official death toll for COVID-19, with over 20,000 deaths. The HHS Inspector General released a report in April of its survey of 323 hospitals in late March; reporting severe shortages of test supplies and extended waits for results, widespread shortages of personal protective equipment (PPE), and other strained resources due to extended patient stays while awaiting test results. Trump called the IG's report "just wrong", and subsequently Trump replaced the inspector general.

Following a dramatic economic downturn as a result of the COVID-19 pandemic, federal intervention in providing Governmental aid was heavily lobbied for resulting in the initial signing of a $8 Billion aid package relating to vaccine research and outbreak prevention among states on March 8, 2020 and a secondary $192 billion aid package addressing sick leave for workers, expanding unemployment benefits and increased testing resources. A subsequent $2.2 trillion aid package was later proposed and signed into law March 27, 2020, titled the CARES Act which provided forgivable loans for small businesses, increased unemployment benefits, a temporary child tax credit and further aid towards state and local governments in addressing the pandemic. The CARES Act emerged as the largest economic stimulus bill in American history with limited opposition against it; passing unanimously in the Senate and 419–6 in the House. An additional $900 Billion would be further dedicated to the pandemic in the 2021 Consolidated Appropriations Act that was signed into law December 27, 2020, despite initial opposition by Trump following criticism of the individual stimulus payments as too low and of the bill as having wasteful spending.

In May 2020, five months into the pandemic, Trump announced that the U.S. would withdraw from the WHO. In July 2020, Trump's secretary of state, Mike Pompeo, formally notified the UN of U.S. decision to withdraw from the WHO, to take effect on July 6, 2021. Biden reversed Trump's decision to withdraw the U.S. from the WHO on January 20, 2021, on his first day in office.

On May 15, 2020, Trump announced the public-private partnership Operation Warp Speed to fund and accelerate the development, manufacture and distribution of a COVID-19 vaccine with $10 billion in funding (later increased to $18 billion). Some of the first companies to develop COVID-19 vaccines, such as AZD1222, mRNA-1273, and Ad26.COV2-S received funding from this program.

In June 2020, amid surges in COVID-19 case numbers, Trump administration officials falsely claimed that the steep rise was due to increased testing; public health experts disputed the administration's claims, noting that the positivity rate of tests was increasing.

In October 2020, after a superspreader event at the White House, Trump announced that he and Melania Trump had tested positive for COVID-19 and would begin quarantining at the White House. Despite having the virus, Trump did not self-isolate and did not abstain from unnecessary risky behaviors. Trump was criticized for leaving his hospital room at Walter Reed National Military Medical Center to go on a joyride to greet his supporters, thus exposing United States Secret Service agents to the disease.

According to sources in the Biden administration, the Trump administration left no plan for vaccine distribution to the Biden administration, however, Anthony Fauci rejected this, stating that they were "certainly not starting from scratch, because there is activity going on in the distribution," and that the new administration was improving upon existing distribution efforts. In the last quarter of 2020, Trump administration officials lobbied Congress not to provide extra funding to states for vaccine rollout, thus hindering the vaccination rollout. One of those officials, Paul Mango, the deputy chief of staff for policy at the Department of Health and Human Services, claimed that states did not need extra money because they hadn't spent all the previously allocated money for vaccines given by the CDC.

== Housing and urban policy ==
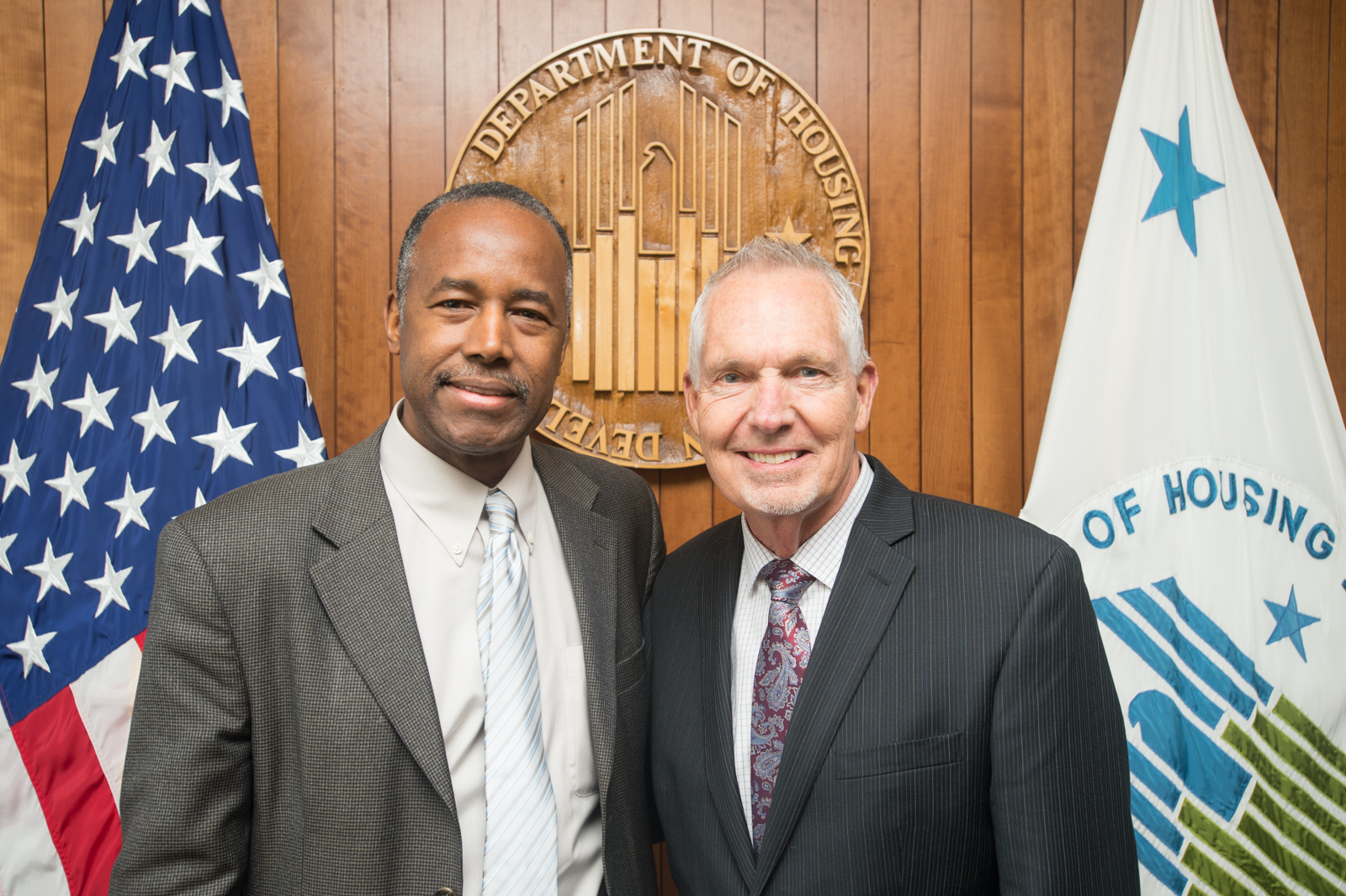
Ben Carson, Secretary of Housing and Urban Development

In December 2017, The Economist described the Department of Housing and Urban Development (HUD), led by Carson, as "directionless". Most of the top HUD positions were unfilled and Carson's leadership was "inconspicuous and inscrutable". Of the policies HUD was enacting, The Economist wrote, "it is hard not to conclude that the governing principle at HUD is to take whatever the Obama administration was doing, and do the opposite." HUD scaled back the enforcement of fair housing laws, halted several fair housing investigations started by the Obama administration and removed the words "inclusive" and "free from discrimination" from its mission statement. The administration designated Lynne Patton, an event planner who had worked on the Trump campaign and planned Eric Trump's wedding, to lead HUD's New York and New Jersey office (which oversees billions of federal dollars).

== Immigration ==
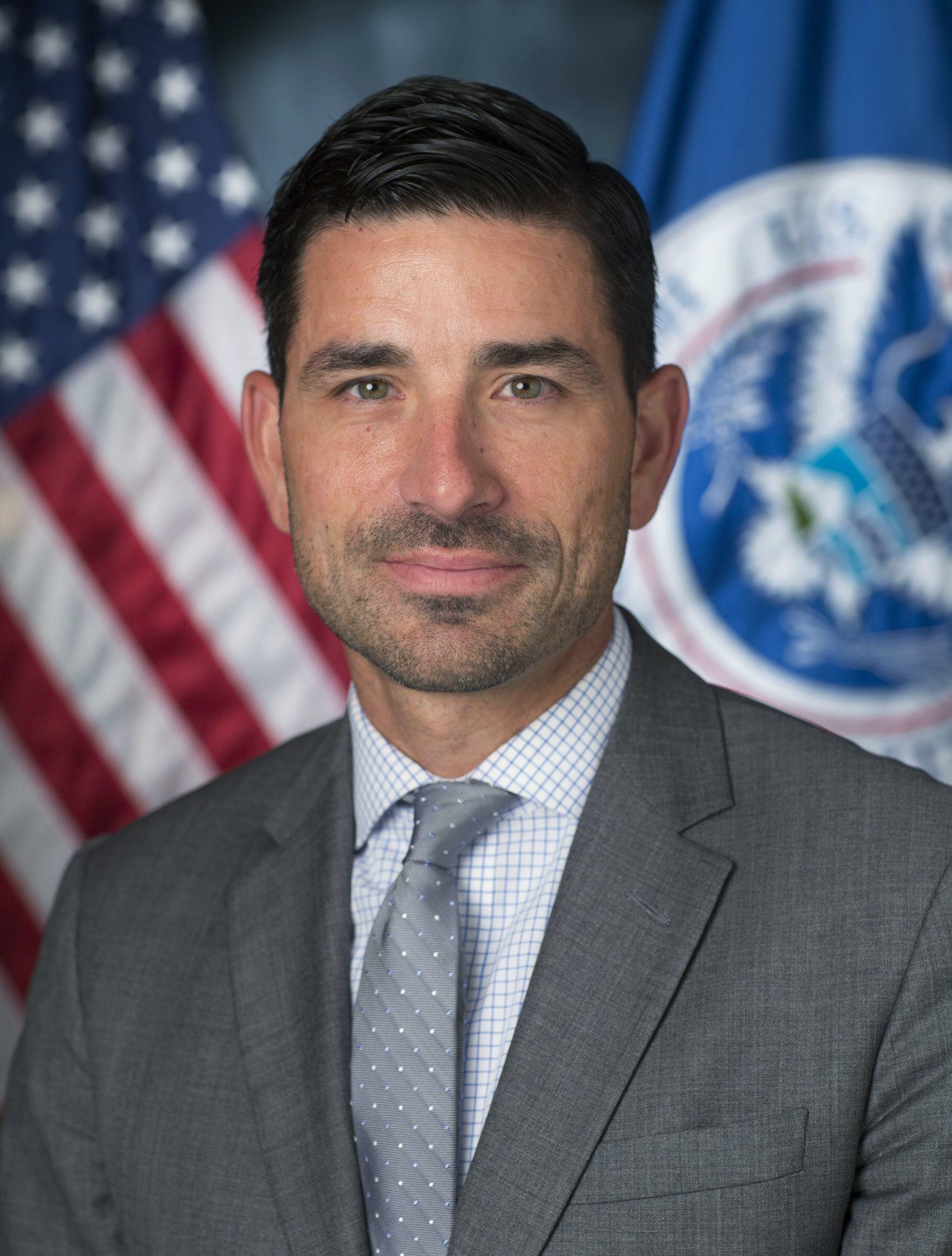
Chad Wolf, acting Secretary of the Department of Homeland Security

Trump has repeatedly characterized illegal immigrants as criminals, although some studies have found they have lower crime and incarceration rates than native-born Americans. Prior to taking office, Trump promised to deport the estimated eleven million illegal immigrants living in the United States and to build a wall along the Mexico–U.S. border. During his presidency, Trump reduced legal immigration substantially while the illegal immigrant population remained the same. The administration took several steps to limit the rights of legal immigrants, which included attempted revocations of Temporary Protected Status for Central American refugees, 60,000 Haitians (who emigrated following the 2010 Haiti earthquake), and 200,000 Salvadorans (who emigrated following a series of devastating earthquakes in 2001) as well as making it illegal for refugees and asylum seekers, and spouses of H-1B visa holders to work in the U.S. A federal judge blocked the administration's attempt to deport the TPS recipients, citing what the judge said was Trump's racial "animus against non-white, non-European immigrants". The administration slashed refugee admissions to record low levels (since the modern program began in 1980). The administration made it harder noncitizens who served in the military to receive necessary paperwork to pursue U.S. citizenship. The administration's key legislative proposal on immigration was the 2017 RAISE Act, a proposal to reduce legal immigration levels to the U.S. by fifty percent by halving the number of green cards issued, capping refugee admissions at 50,000 a year and ending the visa diversity lottery. In 2020, the Trump administration set the lowest cap for refugees in the modern history of the United States for the subsequent year: 15,000 refugees. The administration increased fees for citizen applications, as well as caused delays in the processing of citizen applications.

By February 2018, arrests of undocumented immigrants by ICE increased by forty percent during Trump's tenure. Arrests of noncriminal undocumented immigrants were twice as high as during Obama's final year in office. Arrests of undocumented immigrants with criminal convictions increased only slightly. In 2018, experts noted that the Trump administration's immigration policies had led to an increase in criminality and lawlessness along the U.S.–Mexico border, as asylum seekers prevented by U.S. authorities from filing for asylum had been preyed upon by human smugglers, organized crime and corrupt local law enforcement. To defend administration policies on immigration, the administration fudged data and presented intentionally misleading analyses of the costs associated with refugees (omitting data that showed net positive fiscal effects), as well as created the Victims of Immigration Crime Engagement to highlight crimes committed by undocumented immigrants (there is no evidence undocumented immigrants increase the U.S. crime rate). In January 2018, Trump was widely criticized after referring to Haiti, El Salvador, and African nations in general as "shithole countries" at a bipartisan meeting on immigration. Multiple international leaders condemned his remarks as racist.

Upon taking office, Trump directed the DHS to begin work on a wall. An internal DHS report estimated Trump's wall would cost $21.6 billion and take 3.5 years to build (far higher than the Trump 2016 campaign's estimate ($12 billion) and the $15 billion estimate from Republican congressional leaders). In a January 2017 phone call between Trump and Mexican president Enrique Peña Nieto, Trump conceded that the U.S. would pay for the border wall, not Mexico as he promised during the campaign, and implored Nieto to stop saying publicly the Mexican government would not pay for the border wall. In January 2018, the administration proposed spending $18 billion over the next ten years on the wall, more than half of the $33 billion spending blueprint for border security. Trump's plan would reduce funding for border surveillance, radar technology, patrol boats and customs agents; experts and officials say these are more effective at curbing illegal immigration and preventing terrorism and smuggling than a border wall.

The administration sought to add a citizenship question to the 2020 census, which experts warned would likely result in severe undercounting of the population and faulty data, with naturalized U.S. citizens, legal immigrants, and undocumented immigrants all being less likely to respond to the census. Blue states were estimated to get fewer congressional seats and lower congressional appropriations than they would otherwise get, because they have larger noncitizen populations. Thomas B. Hofeller, an architect of Republican gerrymandering, had found adding the census question would help to gerrymander maps that "would be advantageous to Republicans and non-Hispanic whites" and that Hofeller had later written the key portion of a letter from the Trump administration's Justice Department justifying the addition of a citizenship question by claiming it was needed to enforce the 1965 Voting Rights Act. In July 2019, the Supreme Court in Department of Commerce v. New York blocked the administration from including the citizenship question on the census form.

During the 2018 midterm election campaign, Trump sent nearly 5,600 troops to the U.S.–Mexico border for the stated purpose of protecting the United States against a caravan of Central American migrants. The Pentagon had previously concluded the caravan posed no threat to the U.S. The border deployment was estimated to cost as much as $220 million by the end of the year. With daily warnings from Trump about the dangers of the caravan during the midterm election campaign, the frequency and intensity of the caravan rhetoric nearly stopped after election day.

=== Family separation policy ===
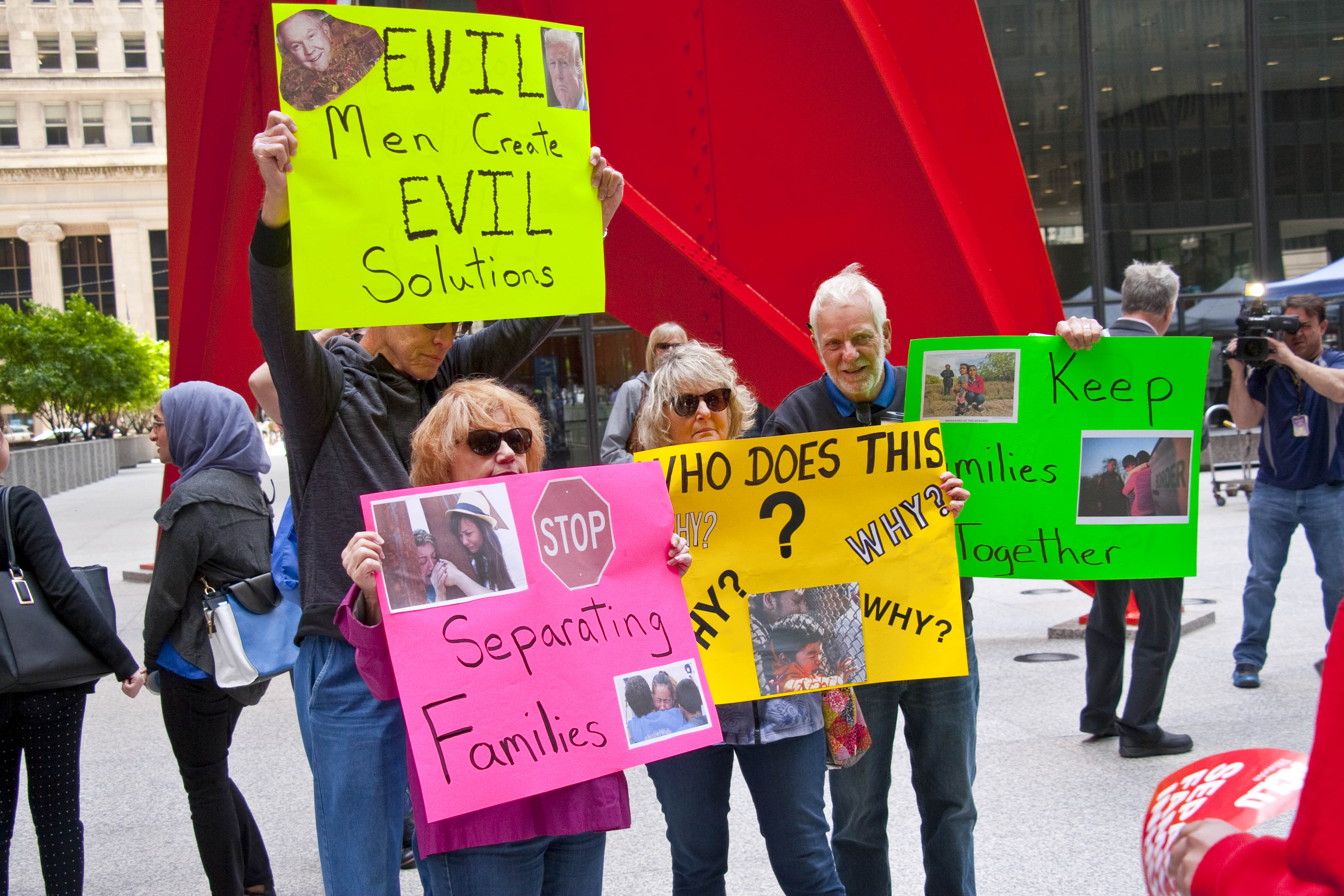
June 2018 protest against the Trump administration family separation policy, in Chicago, Illinois

In May 2018, the administration announced it would separate children from parents caught unlawfully crossing the southern border into the United States. Parents were routinely charged with a misdemeanor and jailed; their children were placed in separate detention centers with no established procedure to track them or reunite them with their parent after they had served time for their offence, generally only a few hours or days. Later that month, Trump falsely accused Democrats of creating that policy, despite it originating from his own administration, and urged Congress to "get together" and pass an immigration bill. Members of Congress from both parties condemned the practice and pointed out that the White House could end the separations on its own. The Washington Post quoted a White House official as saying Trump's decision to separate migrant families was to gain political leverage to force Democrats and moderate Republicans to accept hardline immigration legislation.

Six weeks into the implementation of the "zero tolerance" policy, at least 2,300 migrant children had been separated from their families. The American Academy of Pediatrics, the American College of Physicians and the American Psychiatric Association condemned the policy, with the American Academy of Pediatrics saying the policy was causing "irreparable harm" to the children. The policy was extremely unpopular, more so than any major piece of legislation in recent memory. Videos and images of children held in cage-like detention centers, distraught parents separated from their children, and sobbing children caused an outcry. George Takei and other survivors of Japanese internment camps have also criticized the conditions in these centers. After criticism, DHS secretary Kirstjen Nielsen falsely claimed that "We do not have a policy of separating families at the border."

On June 20, 2018, amid worldwide outrage and enormous political pressure to roll back his policy, Trump reversed the family-separation policy by signing an executive order, despite earlier having said "you can't do it through an executive order." Six days later, as the result of a class-action lawsuit filed by the American Civil Liberties Union, U.S. District Judge Dana Sabraw issued a nationwide preliminary injunction against the family-separation policy, and required the government to reunite separated families within 30 days. By November 2020, the parents of 666 children still had not been found. The administration refused to provide funds to cover the expenses of reuniting families, and volunteer organizations continue to provide both volunteers and funding. The administration also refused to pay for mental health services for the families and orphaned children traumatized by the separations.

=== Travel bans ===
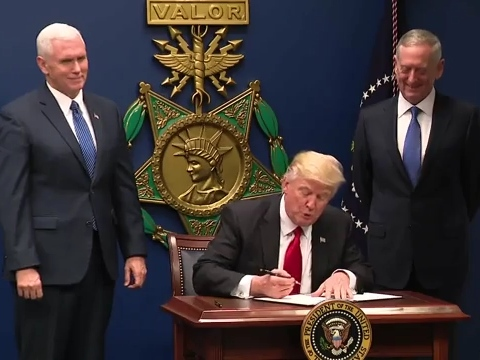
Trump signs Executive Order 13769 at the Pentagon. Vice President Mike Pence (left) and Secretary of Defense James Mattis look on, January 27, 2017.

In January 2017, Trump signed an executive order which indefinitely suspended admission of asylum seekers fleeing the Syrian Civil War, suspended admission of all other refugees for 120 days, and denied entry to citizens of Iraq, Iran, Libya, Somalia, Sudan, Syria and Yemen for 90 days. The order also established a religious test for refugees from Muslim nations by giving priority to refugees of other religions over Muslim refugees. Later, the administration seemed to reverse a portion of part of the order, effectively exempting visitors with a green card. After the order was challenged in the federal courts, several federal judges issued rulings enjoining the government from enforcing the order. Trump fired acting attorney general Sally Yates after she said she would not defend the order in court; Yates was replaced by Dana Boente, who said the Department of Justice would defend the order.

A new executive order was signed in March which limited travel to the U.S. from six different countries for 90 days, and by all refugees who do not possess either a visa or valid travel documents for 120 days. The new executive order revoked and replaced the executive order issued in January.

In June, the Supreme Court partially stayed certain injunctions that were put on the order by two federal appeals courts earlier, allowing the executive order to mostly go into effect. In October, the Court dismissed the case, saying the orders had been replaced by a new proclamation, so challenges to the previous executive orders are moot.

In September, Trump signed a proclamation placing limits on the six countries in the second executive order and added Chad, North Korea, and Venezuela. In October 2017, Judge Derrick Watson, of the U.S. District Court for the District of Hawaii issued another temporary restraining order. In December 2017, the Supreme Court allowed the September 2017 travel restrictions to go into effect while legal challenges in Hawaii and Maryland are heard. The decision effectively barred most citizens of Iran, Libya, Syria, Yemen, Somalia, Chad and North Korea from entry into the United States along with some government officials from Venezuela and their families.

In January 2020, Trump added Nigeria, Myanmar, Eritrea, Kyrgyzstan, Sudan, and Tanzania to the visa ban list.

Amid the ongoing COVID-19 pandemic, Trump further restricted travel from Iran on February 29, 2020, and advised American citizens not to travel to specific regions in Italy and South Korea in response to COVID-19. In March 2020, the Trump administration later issued a ban on entrants from all Schengen Area countries, eventually including Ireland and the UK.

=== 2018–2019 federal government shutdown ===
The federal government was partially shut down from December 22, 2018, until January 25, 2019, (the longest shutdown in U.S. history) over Trump's demand that Congress provide $5.7 billion in federal funds for a U.S.–Mexico border wall. The House and Senate lacked votes necessary to support his funding demand and to overcome Trump's refusal to sign the appropriations last passed by Congress into law. In negotiations with Democratic leaders leading up to the shutdown, Trump commented he would be "proud to shut down the government for border security". By mid-January 2019, the White House Council of Economic Advisors estimated that each week of the shutdown reduced GDP by 0.1 percentage points, the equivalent of 1.2 points per quarter.

In September 2020, Brian Murphy – who until August 2020 was the Under Secretary of Homeland Security for Intelligence and Analysis – asserted in a whistleblower complaint that during the shutdown senior DHS officials sought to inflate the number of known or suspected terrorists who had been apprehended at the border, to increase support for funding the wall. NBC News reported that in early 2019 a DHS spokeswoman, Katie Waldman, pushed the network to retract a story that correctly cited only six such apprehensions in the first half of 2018, compared to the nearly four thousand a year the administration was publicly claiming. The story was not retracted, and Waldman later became the press secretary for Vice President Pence and wife of Trump advisor Stephen Miller.

== LGBTQ rights ==
The administration rolled back numerous LGBTQ protections, in particular those implemented during the Obama administration, covering issues such as health care, education, employment, housing, military, and criminal justice, as well as foster care and adoption. The administration rescinded rules prohibiting taxpayer-funded adoption and foster care agencies from discriminating against LGBTQ adoption and foster parents. The Department of Justice reversed its position on whether the Civil Rights Act's workplace protections covered LGBTQ individuals and argued in state and federal courts for a constitutional right for businesses to discriminate on the basis of sexual orientation and gender identity. The administration exempted government contractors from following federal workplace discrimination rules, as long as they could cite religious reasons for doing so.

The administration rescinded a directive that public schools treat students according to their gender identity. The administration rescinded a federal policy that allowed transgender students to use bathrooms corresponding to their gender identity, and dropped a lawsuit against North Carolina's "bathroom bill". The administration rescinded rules that prohibited discrimination against LGBTQ patients by health care providers. Rules were rescinded to give transgender homeless people equal access to homeless shelters, and to house transgender prison inmates according to their gender identity "when appropriate". HHS stopped collecting information on LGBTQ participants in its national survey of older adults, and the Census Bureau removed "sexual orientation" and "gender identity" as proposed subjects for possible inclusion on the decennial census or American Community Survey. The Justice Department and Labor Department cancelled quarterly conference calls with LGBTQ organizations.

Trump said he would not allow "transgender individuals to serve in any capacity in the U.S. Military", citing disruptions and medical costs. In March 2018, he signed a Presidential Memorandum to prohibit transgender persons, whether transitioned or not, with a history or diagnosis of gender dysphoria from military service, except for individuals who have had 36 consecutive months of stability "in their biological sex before accession" and currently serving transgender persons in military service. Studies have found that allowing transgender individuals to serve in the military has "little or no impact on unit cohesion, operational effectiveness, or readiness" and that medical costs associated with transgender service members would be "minimal".

In 2017, the Treasury Department imposed sanctions on Chechen president Ramzan Kadyrov and a Chechen law enforcement official, citing anti-gay purges in Chechnya. In February 2019, the administration launched a global campaign to end the criminalization of homosexuality; the initiative was pushed by Richard Grenell, the U.S. ambassador to Germany. Asked about the administration's campaign, Trump appeared to be unaware of it. In February 2020, Trump appointed Grenell acting Director of National Intelligence (DNI), marking the first time in history an openly gay official served in a Cabinet Level position.

== George Floyd protests ==
Avatar of Donald Trump

Donald Trump
(@realDonaldTrump)
tweeted:

Replying to @realDonaldTrump

....These THUGS are dishonoring the memory of George Floyd, and I won't let that happen. Just spoke to Governor Tim Walz and told him that the Military is with him all the way. Any difficulty and we will assume control but, when the looting starts, the shooting starts. Thank you!

May 29, 2020

In response to the 2020 rioting and looting amid nationwide protests against racism and police brutality after a white Minneapolis Police Department officer murdered an African American man named George Floyd, Trump tweeted a quote, "when the looting starts, the shooting starts", coined in 1967 by a Miami police chief that has been widely condemned by civil rights groups. Trump later addressed protestors outside the White House by saying they "would have been greeted with the most vicious dogs, and most ominous weapons, I have ever seen" if they breached the White House fence.

=== Photo-op at St. John's Episcopal Church ===
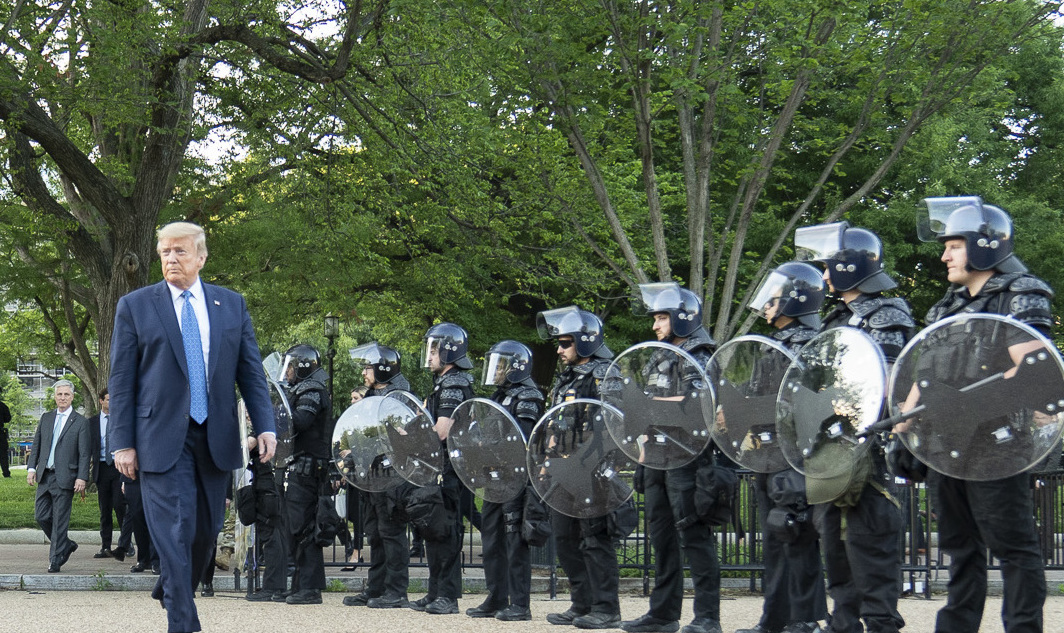
Trump returns to the White House after posing for a photo op at St. John's Episcopal Church, June 2020.

On June 1, 2020, hundreds of police officers, members of the National Guard and other forces, in riot gear used smoke canisters, rubber bullets, batons and shields to disperse a crowd of peaceful protesters outside St. John's Episcopal Church across Lafayette Square from the White House. A news crew from Australia was attacked by these forces and clergy on the church's porch suffered effects of the gas and were dispersed along with the others. Trump, accompanied by other officials including the secretary of defense, then walked across Lafayette Square and posed for pictures while he was holding a Bible up for the cameras, outside the church which had suffered minor damage from a fire started by arsonists the night before. Mariann Edgar Budde, Bishop of the Episcopal Diocese of Washington said she was "outraged" by Trump's actions, which also received widespread condemnation from other religious leaders. However, the reaction from the religious right and evangelicals generally praised the visit.

=== Deployment of federal law enforcement to cities ===
In July 2020, federal forces were deployed to Portland, Oregon, in response to rioting during protests against police brutality, which had resulted in vandalism to the city's federal courthouse. The Department of Homeland Security cited Trump's June 26 executive order to protect statues and monuments as allowing federal officers to be deployed without the permission of individual states. Federal agents fired pepper spray or tear gas at protesters who got too close to the U.S. courthouse. The heavily armed officers were dressed in military camouflage uniforms (without identification) and used unmarked vans to arrest protestors, some of whom were nowhere near the federal courthouse.

The presence and tactics of the officers drew widespread condemnation. Oregon officials including the governor, the mayor of Portland, and multiple members of Congress asked the DHS to remove federal agents from the city. The mayor said the officers were causing violence and "we do not need or want their help." Multiple Congressional committees asked for an investigation, saying "Citizens are concerned that the Administration has deployed a secret police force." Lawsuits against the administration were filed by the American Civil Liberties Union and the attorney general of Oregon. The inspectors general for the Justice Department and Homeland Security announced investigations into the deployment.

Trump said he was pleased with the way things were going in Portland and said that he might send federal law enforcement to many more cities, including New York, Chicago, Philadelphia, Detroit, Baltimore, and Oakland – "all run by liberal Democrats". Albuquerque and Milwaukee were also named as potential targets.

Under a deal worked out between Governor Kate Brown and the Trump administration, federal agents withdrew to standby locations on July 30, while state and local law enforcement forces took over responsibility for protecting the courthouse; they made no arrests and mostly stayed out of sight. Protests that night were peaceful. A DHS spokesperson said federal officers would remain in the area at least until the following Monday.

== Science ==
The administration marginalized the role of science in policymaking, halted numerous research projects, and saw the departure of scientists who said their work was marginalized or suppressed. In 2018, 19 months after Trump took office, meteorologist Kelvin Droegemeier became the Science Advisor to the President; this was the longest period without a science advisor since the 1976 administration. While preparing for talks with Kim Jong-un, the White House did not do so with the assistance of a White House science adviser or senior counselor trained in nuclear physics. The position of chief scientist in the State Department or the Department of Agriculture was not filled. The administration nominated Sam Clovis to be chief scientist in the U.S. Department of Agriculture, but he had no scientific background and the White House later withdrew the nomination. The administration successfully nominated Jim Bridenstine, who had no background in science and rejected the scientific consensus on climate change, to lead NASA. The U.S. Department of the Interior, the National Oceanic and Atmospheric Administration, and the Food and Drug Administration (FDA) disbanded advisory committees, while the Department of Energy prohibited use of the term "climate change". In March 2020, The New York Times reported that an official at the Interior Department has repeatedly inserted climate change-denying language into the agency's scientific reports, such as those that affect water and mineral rights.

During the 2020 COVID-19 pandemic, the Trump administration replaced career public affairs staff at the Department of Health and Human Services with political appointees, including Michael Caputo, who interfered with weekly Centers for Disease Control scientific reports and attempted to silence the government's most senior infectious disease expert, Anthony Fauci, "sowing distrust of the FDA at a time when health leaders desperately need people to accept a vaccine in order to create the immunity necessary to defeat the novel coronavirus". One day after Trump noted that he might dismiss an FDA proposal to improve standards for emergency use of a COVID-19 vaccine, the presidents of the National Academies of Sciences and Medicine issued a statement expressing alarm at political interference in science during a pandemic, "particularly the overriding of evidence and advice from public health officials and derision of government scientists".

== Space ==
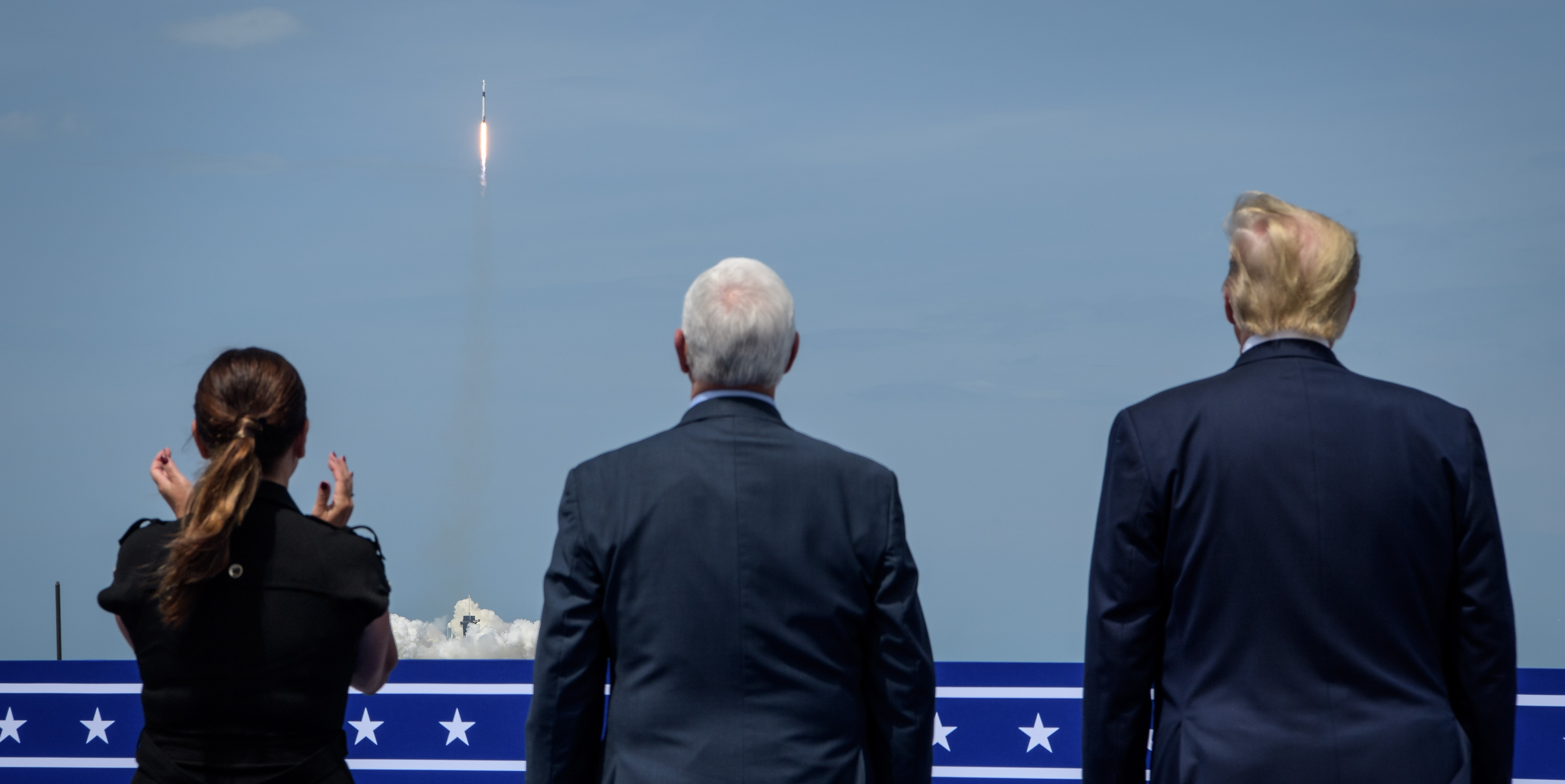
Vice President Mike Pence, Second Lady Karen Pence and President Donald Trump watch the Crew Dragon Demo-2 Falcon 9 rocket launch from Kennedy Space Center.

NASA began the Artemis program in December 2017, with its initial focus on returning humans to the Moon for commercial mining and research, aiming to secure the leading position in the emerging commercial space race. Trump also promoted the United States Space Force. On December 20, 2019, the Space Force Act, developed by Democratic representative Jim Cooper and Republican representative Mike Rogers, was signed as part of the National Defense Authorization Act. The act reorganized the Air Force Space Command into the United States Space Force, and created the first new independent military service since the Army Air Forces were reorganized as the U.S. Air Force in 1947.

== Surveillance ==
In 2019, Trump signed into law a six-year extension of Section 702 of the Foreign Intelligence Surveillance Act, allowing the NSA to conduct searches of foreigners' communications without any warrant. The process incidentally collects information from Americans.

== Veterans affairs ==
Prior to David Shulkin's firing in April 2018, The New York Times described the U.S. Department of Veterans Affairs (VA) as a "rare spot of calm in the Trump administration". Shulkin built upon changes started under the Obama administration to do a long-term overhaul of the VA system. In May 2018, legislation to increase veterans' access to private care was stalled, as was a VA overhaul which sought to synchronize medical records. In May 2018, there were reports of a large number of resignations of senior staffers and a major reshuffling.

In August 2018, ProPublica reported that three wealthy patrons of Trump's Mar-a-Lago club, formed an "informal council" that strongly influenced VA policy, including reviewing a confidential $10 billion contract to modernize the VA's records. The Government Accountability Office announced in November 2018 that it would investigate the matter.

In 2018, Trump signed into law the VA MISSION Act, which expanded eligibility for the Veterans Choice program, allowing veterans greater access to private sector healthcare. Trump falsely asserted more than 150 times that he created the Veterans Choice program, which has in fact existed since being signed into law by president Obama in 2014.

== Voting rights ==
Under the Trump administration, the Justice Department limited enforcement actions to protect voting rights, and in fact often defended restrictions on voting rights imposed by various states that have been challenged as voter suppression. The Justice Department under Trump has filed only a single new case under the Voting Rights Act of 1965. Trump's Justice Department opposed minority voters' interests in all of the major voting litigation since 2017 in which the Justice Department Civil Rights Division Voting Section has been involved.

Trump has repeatedly alleged, without evidence, there was widespread voter fraud. The administration created a commission with the stated purpose to review the extent of voter fraud in the wake of Trump's false claim that millions of unauthorized votes cost him the popular vote in the 2016 election. It was chaired by Vice President Pence, while the day-to-day administrator was Kris Kobach, best known for promoting restrictions on access to voting. The commission began its work by requesting each state to turn over detailed information about all registered voters in their database. Most states rejected the request, citing privacy concerns or state laws. Multiple lawsuits were filed against the commission. Maine Secretary of State Matthew Dunlap said Kobach was refusing to share working documents and scheduling information with him and the other Democrats on the commission. A federal judge ordered the commission to hand over the documents. Shortly thereafter, Trump disbanded the commission, and informed Dunlap that it would not obey the court order to provide the documents because the commission no longer existed. Election integrity experts argued that the commission was disbanded because of the lawsuits, which would have led to greater transparency and accountability and thus prevented the Republican members of the commission from producing a sham report to justify restrictions on voting rights. It was later revealed the commission had, in its requests for Texas voter data, specifically asked for data that identifies voters with Hispanic surnames.

== White nationalists and Charlottesville rally ==
On August 13, 2017, Trump condemned violence "on many sides" after a gathering of hundreds of white nationalists in Charlottesville, Virginia, the previous day (August 12) turned deadly. A white supremacist drove a car into a crowd of counter-protesters, killing one woman and injuring 19 others. According to Sessions, that action met the definition of domestic terrorism. During the rally there had been other violence, as some counter-protesters charged at the white nationalists with swinging clubs and mace, throwing bottles, rocks, and paint. Trump did not expressly mention neo-Nazis, white supremacists, or the alt-right movement in his remarks on August 13, but the following day condemned "the KKK, neo-Nazis, white supremacists, and other hate groups". On August 15, he again blamed "both sides".

Many Republican and Democratic elected officials condemned the violence and hatred of white nationalists, neo-Nazis and alt-right activists. Trump came under criticism from world leaders and politicians, as well as a variety of religious groups and anti-hate organizations for his remarks, which were seen as muted and equivocal. The New York Times reported Trump "was the only national political figure to spread blame for the 'hatred, bigotry and violence' that resulted in the death of one person to 'many sides'", and said Trump had "buoyed the white nationalist movement on Tuesday as no president has done in generations".

== See also ==
- Bibliography of Donald Trump
- Efforts to impeach Donald Trump
- List of United States presidential vetoes § Donald Trump
- Make America Great Again
- Political positions of Donald Trump
- Second presidency of Donald Trump
