= Federal Student Aid =

Office of the United States Department of Education

Federal Student Aid (FSA), an office of the U.S. Department of Education, is the largest provider of student financial aid in the United States. Federal Student Aid provides student financial assistance in the form of grants, loans, and work-study funds. FSA is a Performance-Based Organization, and was the first PBO to be established in the US government.

Federal Student Aid is also responsible for the development, distribution, and processing of the Free Application for Federal Student Aid (FAFSA), the fundamental qualifying form used for all federal student aid distribution programs, as well as for many state, regional, and private student aid programs. Each year Federal Student Aid's staff processes approximately 22 million FAFSAs. Additionally, Federal Student Aid is responsible for enforcing the financial aid rules and regulations required by the Higher Education Act of 1965 and the U.S. Department of Education and managing the federal student loan portfolio.

== Mission ==
Federal Student Aid's core mission is to ensure that all eligible Americans benefit from federal financial assistance—grants, loans and work-study programs—for education beyond high school. The programs Federal Student Aid administers comprise the nation's largest source of student financial aid: during the 2010–11 school year alone, Federal Student Aid provided approximately $144 billion in new aid to nearly 15 million postsecondary students and their families. A staff of 1,200 is based in 10 cities in addition to the Washington, DC, headquarters. In 2021, U.S. Education Secretary Miguel Cardona appointed Richard Cordray, the former head of the U.S. Consumer Financial Protection Bureau (CFPB), to the post of chief operating officer of Federal Student Aid. Cordray said he would work to "create more pathways to education…not burdened by insurmountable debt." The program, as of September 2020, had 5.5 million individuals in default for $122 billion. The Federal Reserve Bank of New York reported that 20% of all student debt – mostly in the federal program – is at least 90% delinquent.

While overseeing $864 billion in outstanding student loans, Federal Student Aid aims to ensure that all partners in the student aid community—schools, servicers and guaranty agencies—operate fairly, honestly and efficiently. Another key role the organization performs is ensuring students and their families are aware that financial aid is available and is an important first step to education beyond high school. Federal Student Aid distributes numerous publications both in print and online and runs several customer call centers. Most of these services are also provided in Spanish.

== Student aid ==
Federal Student Aid provides financial assistance to students enrolled in eligible programs at participating postsecondary schools (accredited four-year or two-year public or private educational institutions, career schools or trade schools) to cover the cost of education expenses, including tuition and fees, room and board, books and supplies, and transportation. Most federal aid is need-based. The three most common types of aid are grants, loans, and work-study funds.

Grants are a type of financial aid that does not have to be repaid. Generally, grants are for undergraduate students and the grant amount is based on need, cost of attendance, and enrollment status.

- Federal Pell Grants are designed for low- and middle-income undergraduate students. Pell Grants for the 2023–2024 school year range from $750 to $7,395.
- The Iraq & Afghanistan Service Grant is awarded to students who are ineligible for a Pell Grant only because of the program’s need requirements and whose parent or guardian died as a result of military service in Iraq or Afghanistan after September 11, 2001. The maximum award is $7,395 for the 2023–2024 school year.
- The Teacher Education Assistance for College and Higher Education (TEACH) Grant is awarded to undergraduate, postbaccalaureate, or graduate students who are taking coursework necessary to become elementary or secondary teachers. Recipients of this grant must agree to serve as a full-time teacher in a high-need field in a public or private elementary or secondary school that serves low-income students for at least four academic years. The maximum award is $4000 for the 2023–2024 academic year.
- The Federal Supplemental Educational Opportunity Grant (FSEOG) is a federal assistance grant reserved for college students with the greatest need for financial aid to attend school. The maximum FSEOG is $4,000 a year and the amount applicants are eligible for is at the discretion of the college.

Loans are borrowed money that must be repaid with interest. Both undergraduate and graduate students may borrow money. Parents may also borrow to pay education expenses for dependent undergraduate students.

- Federal Stafford Loans are made to students and PLUS Loans are made to parents through the William D. Ford Federal Direct Loan (Direct Loan) Program: Eligible students and parents borrow directly from the federal government at participating schools. Direct Loans include Direct Stafford Loans, Direct PLUS Loans, and Direct Consolidation Loans.
- The Federal Family Education Loan (FFEL) Program: Until July 1, 2010, a large percentage of federal loans were made through private lenders with federally guaranteed funds. FFEL loans included FFEL Stafford Loans, FFEL PLUS Loans, and FFEL Consolidation Loans. The FFEL Program ended on July 1, 2010 under provisions of the Health Care and Education Reconciliation Act of 2010. All new Stafford, PLUS, and consolidation loans are now administered through the Direct Loan Program.

Campus-Based Aid includes types of aid that schools are responsible for administering on behalf of the federal government.

- Federal Perkins Loans are low-interest loans made through a school’s financial aid office using federal funds. Undergraduate and graduate students with exceptional financial need are eligible to receive a Federal Perkins Loan.
- The Federal Supplemental Educational Opportunity Grant (FSEOG) is a program through which Federal Student Aid provides funds to schools, who in turn offer the grant to students. FSEOG grants range from $100 to $4,000 during the 2011–2012 school year.
- The Federal Work-Study program provides part-time jobs for undergraduate and graduate students with financial need, allowing them to earn money to help pay education expenses.

== Works cited ==
- Hegji, Alexandra; Hogue, Henry B. (December 30, 2019). The Office of Federal Student Aid as a Performance-Based Organization (Report). Congressional Research Service.
