= Abigail Seldin =

American entrepreneur

- Born: Abigail Pamela Seldin
- Occupation: Chief Growth Officer at Scholarship America
- Years active: 2008–present
- Known for: Co-founder of Seldin/Haring-Smith Foundation, College Abacus and SwiftStudent
- Board member of: Association of American Rhodes Scholars
- Spouse: Whitney Haring-Smith (m. 2012)
- Children: 2
- Website: Profile

Abigail Pamela Seldin (born January 1988) is an American philanthropist, higher education expert, and edtech entrepreneur. She is Chief Growth Officer at Scholarship America and co-founder of the Seldin/Haring-Smith Foundation, having previously been its CEO. She founded College Abacus, a net price calculator aggregator company, which she sold to Educational Credit Management Corporation (ECMC Group). In 2020, she founded SwiftStudent, a free financial aid tool for students.

== Early life and education ==
Seldin was born in January 1988 to Judith Seldin-Cohen and David Seldin. She attended Phillips Academy, followed by the University of Pennsylvania and graduated in 2009 with a BA and MS degree in anthropology. While in college, Seldin curated a gallery exhibition, Fulfilling a Prophecy: The Past and Present of the Lenape in Pennsylvania, at the Penn Museum. The exhibit highlighted how the cultural heritage of the Lenape people survived their displacement after contact with European settlers in the 17th century.

In 2008, Seldin was awarded a Rhodes Scholarship to attend Oxford University, where she pursued a DPhil in social anthropology. However, she did not complete this degree. She completed a fellowship in cultural heritage tourism at Hong Kong Tourism Board as a Henry Luce Scholar. In 2015, she was named to the Forbes 30 Under 30 list in the Education category.

== Career ==
In 2012, Seldin and her husband, Whitney Haring-Smith, co-founded College Abacus, a web tool that allows prospective students to compare individualized financial aid packages from American colleges and universities. She was chief executive officer until it was acquired by ECMC Group, a student loan collection agency, in 2014. After the acquisition, she was VP of Innovation at the Washington DC office of ECMC Group. Under Seldin's leadership, debt-repayment and other data from the Obama Administration's College Scorecard initiative were incorporated into College Abacus.

Seldin was a candidate for the role of chief operating officer for the Office of Federal Student Aid during the Biden administration. In 2021, Seldin published a research report on fraud and links to sex trafficking in certain schools which offer massage therapy certification. The report on sex trafficking and federal financial aid, which studied 18 institutions in five states, was cited as a rationale for an investigation by the United States House Committee on Oversight and Reform in summer 2021.

In January 2024, Seldin became Chief Growth Officer at Scholarship America.

Seldin is on the board of Open Campus, and Association of American Rhodes Scholars. She previously was on the boards of the Temple University Hope Center, the Montgomery College Foundation. She frequently writes on the topics of educational policy and student financial aid, as seen in a number of publications, including HuffPost, The Hill, Salon.com, The Philadelphia Inquirer, and CNN.

== Seldin/Haring-Smith Foundation ==
In 2019, she co-founded the Seldin/Haring-Smith Foundation, a charitable organization In a 2021 interview, Seldin described how she and her husband were inspired to found the foundation because of what they saw as an opportunity to fund nonprofit organizations that could help reform both policy and public opinion.

The Seldin/Haring-Smith Foundation helped to establish a partnership between the National Head Start Association and the Association of Community College Trustees which is relocating Head Start centers to community college campuses in the United States. This initiative is intended to increase the availability of on-campus childcare and reverse the trend of declining enrollment and staffing shortages at Head Start centers. The first Head Start relocation associated with the project opened in August 2023.

=== SwiftStudent ===
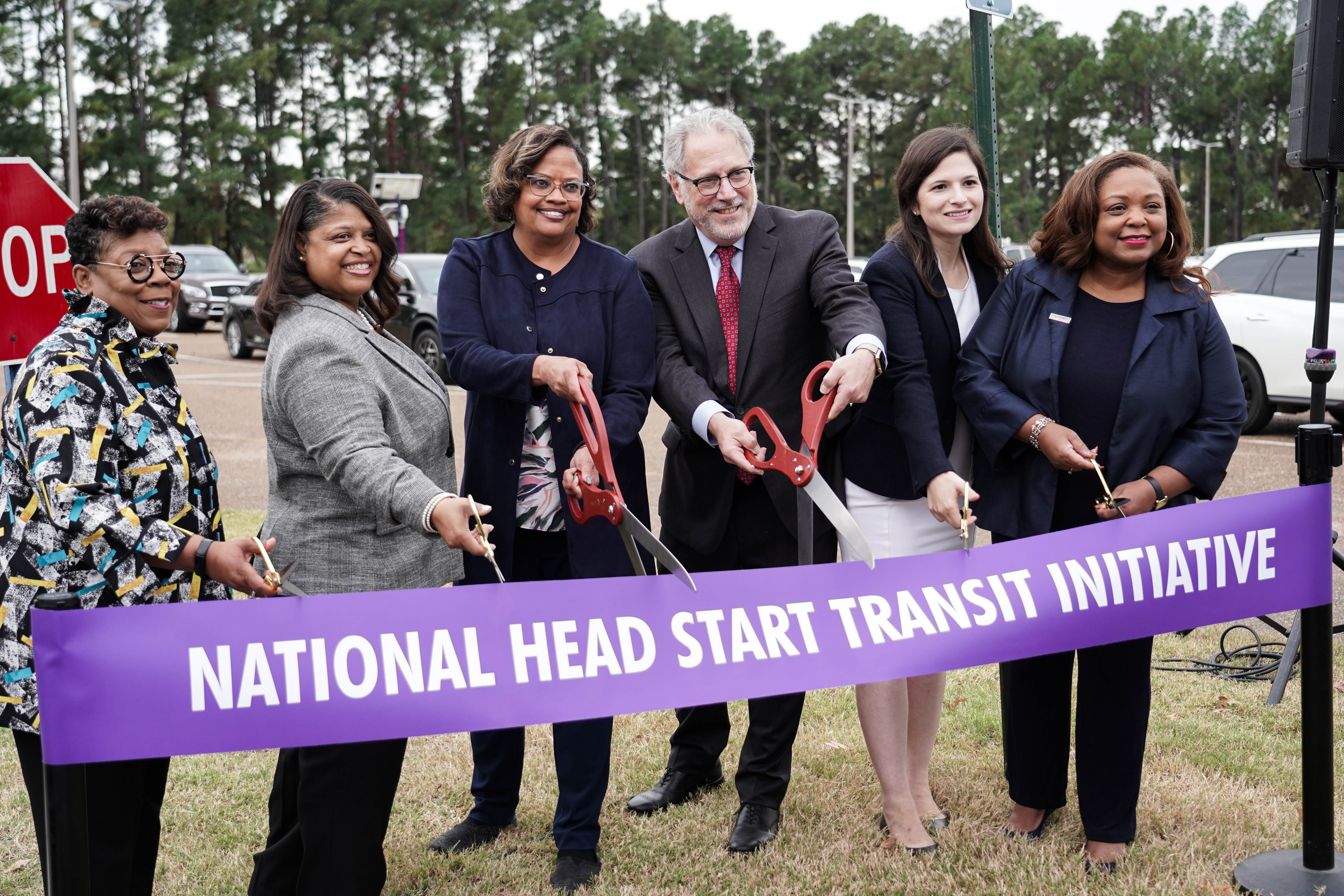
Seldin at the ribbon-cutting for the Memphis launch of the National Head Start Transit Initiative

During the COVID-19 pandemic, the Seldin/Haring-Smith Foundation created a no-cost online service called SwiftStudent, to help students submit a financial aid appeal to their institution's aid office. SwiftStudent was named a finalist in Fast Company's World Changing Ideas Awards. As of 2020, the Seldin/Haring-Smith Foundation had partnered with 17 colleges and higher education organizations to test features of SwiftStudent with focus groups of students and financial aid officers. SwiftStudent is operated by FormSwift, which was acquired by Dropbox in 2022.

=== Civic Mapping Initiative ===
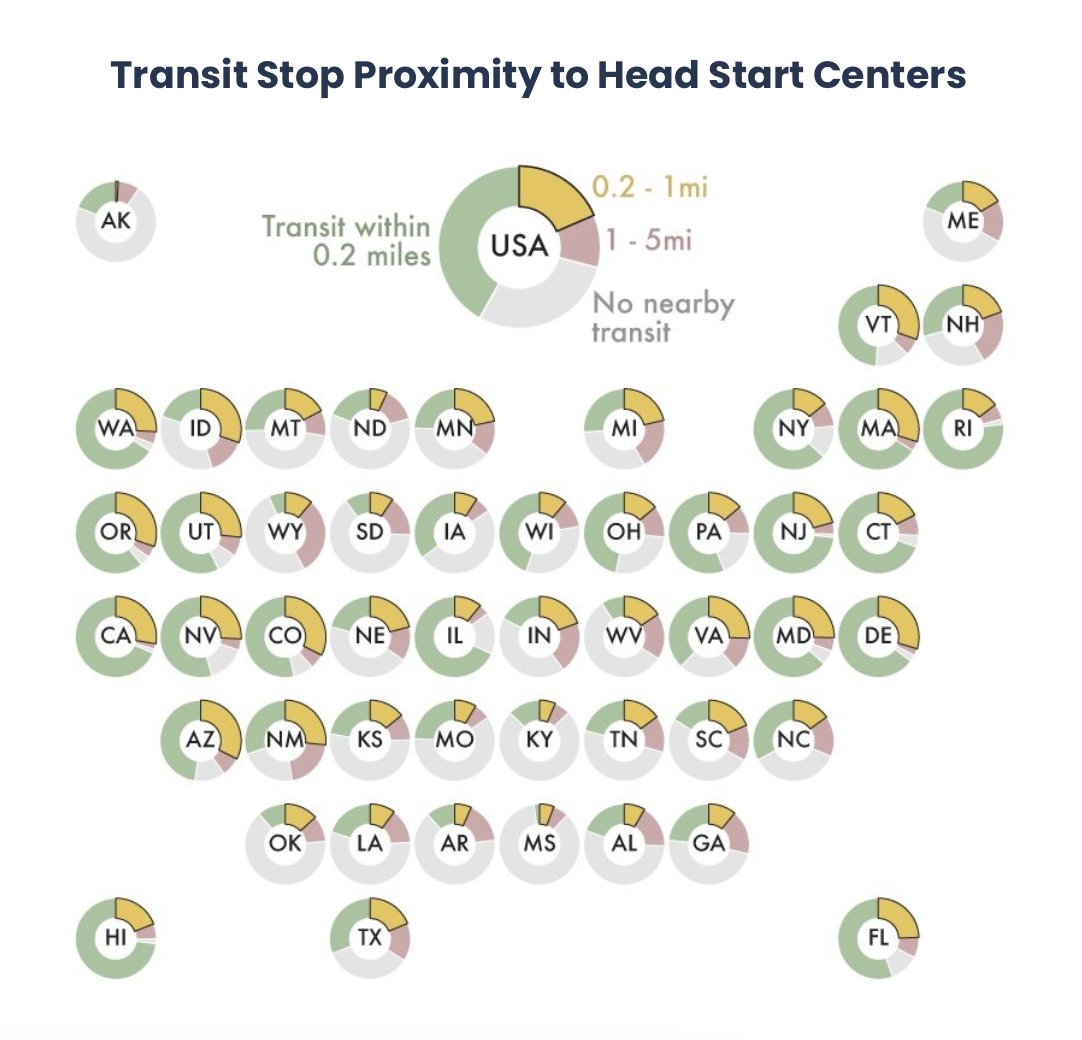
CMI graphic showing public transit proximity to Head Start Centers

The SHSF released the SHSF Public Transit Map in 2021, which found that 57% of community colleges were accessible by public transit and an additional 25% could be made accessible by extending existing bus lines. In 2022, the SHSF launched the Civic Mapping Initiative, a research center which maps the accessibility of public transit and identifies opportunities for improving accessibility through public policy. The initiative has published analyses and interactive maps of public transit access to community colleges across the United States, as well as statewide and regional maps.

The SHSF Public Transit Map map was cited in the introduction of the bipartisan Promoting Advancement Through Transit Help (PATH) to College Act in 2021. The Civic Mapping Initiative's work was cited in the PATH to College Act's reintroduction in 2023.

The initiative has also partnered with the National Head Start Association to map the distances between public transit stops and Head Start centers. The Civic Mapping Initiative's findings have led to collaboration between local and national organizations in several states to relocate bus stops closer to Head Start centers, to make the centers more accessible to students and parents. The cities of Memphis, Tennessee and Alexandria, Virginia attributed their decisions to relocate transit stops closer to Head Start centers to data provided by the Civic Mapping Initiative.

The Civic Mapping Initiative was acquired by the National League of Cities in December 2023.

== Personal life ==
Seldin met fellow Rhodes Scholar Whitney Haring-Smith in 2009 and they married in Florida in 2012.
