= Brian Safdari =

- Born: Abdullah Safdari
- Education: California State University-Northridge; American InterContinental University
- Occupation: President/Founder/CEO of College Planning Experts

Brian Safdari is the founder and CEO of College Planning Experts, Inc. College Planning Experts is a consulting firm based in Valencia, California that advises high school students and their parents throughout the process of getting accepted to the college of their choice, maximizing financial aid, and paying for college. Safdari is known for his weekly radio shows, College Planning Secrets Exposed and Your College Planning Power Hour, and for a variety of appearances on local and national television programs, including Good Day LA. He is also the author of the self-published book, College Planning Made Easy.

== Early life ==
Brian Safdari (born Abdullah Safdari) left Afghanistan with his family in the 1980s and arrived in the United States in 1986 at the age of 5, settling in the San Fernando Valley, California. In 1996, Safdari, then intent on a professional soccer career, joined the California state soccer team. In 1998, Safdari was one of three California players selected to play on the USA junior team for the 1998 World Cup in France.

After returning from the World Cup in 1998, Safdari suffered a groin injury that ended his soccer career. Consequently, several anticipated athletics fellowships at top universities never materialized and Safdari was forced to take out loans to pay for college.

== Education ==
Brian Safdari is a first-generation college student. He attended California State University Northridge (CSUN), and received his bachelor's degree from American InterContinental University where he majored in business administration.

== Career ==
In 2003, Safdari began his career in the real estate industry.

In 2004, he founded College Planning Experts, a consulting firm that provides college planning, financial aid services, and free workshops at locations throughout Los Angeles County, California. After graduating college with a significant amount of debt, Safdari was inspired to study the Higher Education Act and create College Planning Experts. "He realized that by understanding the process - filling out financial aid forms properly, protecting assets, securing interest-free need loans, and searching for schools that granted endowment and institutional merit money - people could avoid the debt he incurred." College Planning Experts provides a variety of services, such as a "best fit college search", a financial overview, completion of FAFSA and CSS Profile, and unlimited telephone support.

Safdari is a member of various organizations, including: National Institute of Certified College Planners, National Association for College Admission Counseling, National College Advocacy Group, Higher Education Consultants Association, and the Better Business Bureau. He worked with US Congressman Howard McKeon on the US Higher Education Act.

Safdari frequently appears on television channels and in print, including CNN, Fox News, Bravo, and TLC, as well as local news programs. He is also a national speaker on topics such as career counseling, college acceptance, college funding and financial aid. College Planning Experts’ corporate clientele include Warner Bros., Nestle, and Morgan Stanley.

== Philanthropy ==
In his capacity as the founder and CEO of College Planning Experts, Safdari offers free community workshops and performs speaking engagements at high schools and public libraries. Safdari is a "big supporter" of The LEAP Foundation, which was co-founded by Dr. Bill Dorfman who is the celebrity dentist from the television show, Extreme Makeover. The LEAP foundation is a non-profit foundation focusing on youth leadership and empowerment. Its LEAP summer leadership program hosts motivational speakers and celebrities that include Jessalyn Gilsig, Seth Green, and Nick Vujicic, as well as Safdari, who spoke to audiences about college planning and financing.
