= Jefferson Dollars for Scholars =

Educational philanthropic organization

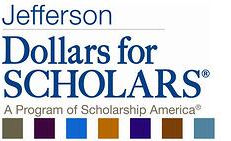
- Established: 1993
- Founder: Lisa Conescu
- Location: Metairie, Louisiana
- Website: http://www.jefferson.dollarsforscholars.org

Jefferson Dollars for Scholars is a Jefferson Parish, Louisiana-based philanthropic organization founded in 1993 whose mission is to expand access to educational opportunities for Jefferson Parish Public Schools students through scholarships and academic support.

== History ==
Jefferson Dollars for Scholars is a chapter of the Minnesota-based American philanthropic organization Scholarship America, an organization founded in 1958 by optometrist Dr. Irving A. Fradkin. He believed in the power of a dollar to make a difference in the lives of aspiring scholars without the means to pursue a college education. He envisioned people coming together in communities—each donating one dollar or more—to raise funds to award college scholarships.

He received his first donation from Eleanor Roosevelt. To date, Dr. Fradkin's vision has led to the inception of 1100 chapters across the U.S., including Jefferson Dollars for Scholars. Together, these chapters have raised over $3 billion and contributed to sending more than two million students to college.

Jefferson Dollars for Scholars was founded in Jefferson Parish, Louisiana in 1993, by a group of local community leaders to make post-secondary education a priority and a possibility for academically deserving students.

== Recognition ==
Jefferson Dollars for Scholars received the Golden Tassel Award for Outstanding New Chapter in the country in 1996. In 2002 and 2010, it received the Golden Tassel Award for Outstanding Chapter. Jefferson Dollars for Scholars is the only chapter that has been nationally recognized more than once.

Scholarship America was rated 4/4 by Charity Navigator for 10 years in a row (2001–2011). The Chronicle of Philanthropy routinely lists Scholarship America in their top 100 lists of American nonprofits and as one of the largest charities in Minnesota.

== Programs ==
Jefferson Dollars for Scholars programs are open to all students of Jefferson Parish Public Schools. Through a systems approach that involves family engagement early on, the following programs are offered:

- Summer Academic Enrichment Scholarships: K-8 grade recipients receive a scholarship and are exposed to learning outside of an academic setting. Students may choose from over 100 camps to learn about theater, science, art and more.
- National Merit Scholarship Preparation Classes: This program assists high school students in receiving t prestigious scholarships by raising their PSAT scores and encouraging academic excellence.
- To the TOPS ACT Preparation Classes: This program provides high school students with the necessary tools to increase ACT scores and achieve eligibility for the state-funded TOPS program.
- College Scholarships: This program is for graduating seniors, with most recipients receiving four-year scholarships. Due to relationships with community and educational partners, actual scholarship dollars are multiplied by four.
- Laptops for Scholars: This is a response to the needs of college recipients who were attending university without their most important school supplies. Since 2006, every college recipient has received a refurbished laptop.
- Alumni Network/Support Program: This creates mentorship/networking opportunities between high school seniors, college alums and the individual's board members and sponsors.
