= SwiftStudent =

American financial aid website

- Website type: Digital repository of information for student financial aid applicants
- Available in: English
- Area served: United States
- Industry: Educational technology
- Website: https://formswift.com/swift-student
- Commercial: No
- Registration: None
- Launched: April 2020
- Current status: Active

SwiftStudent is a free financial aid service which was created in 2020. The website is repository of template letters and applications for financial aid. The site includes information about the financial aid process, and student eligibility for various forms of financial aid.

== History ==
Seldin began developing the idea for SwiftStudent in 2019, based on her observation that many students were unaware of the forms of financial aid available to them. The site was developed in partnership with FormSwift.

The Seldin/Haring-Smith Foundation partnered with various colleges, educational organizations and advocacy groups to develop its features, including ACT, Institute for Women's Policy Research, and New America. SwiftStudent was launched in April 2020.

In 2021, SwiftStudent was a named finalist in Fast Company's World Changing Ideas Awards for "Education" and "Pandemic Response".
