= Pell Grant =

U.S. federal student aid subsidy

Award Calculations & Architecture
Core Program Metrics (2026–2027)
- Max Scheduled Award: $7,395
- Min Scheduled Award: $740
- Lifetime Limit: 600% (Equivalent to 6 full academic years)
- Funding Source: Federal discretionary & mandatory appropriations

The 3-Tier Eligibility Architecture
- Tier 1: Automatic Max: Guaranteed maximum award if family income falls below certain thresholds relative to the Federal Poverty Guidelines, bypassing the SAI entirely.
- Tier 2: SAI-Calculated: Award determined strictly by subtracting the student's FAFSA-generated baseline score from the maximum caps.
- Tier 3: Automatic Min: Minimum safety-net award for higher-income students who fail the standard math checks but still qualify based on family status.

Scheduled Award Formula
- For standard term programs, the baseline annual award is structured around the student's unique financial profile: Award = Max Pell ($7,395) - SAI  (Result rounded to the nearest $5) • Note on Negative Scores: SAIs from -1,500 to -1 are treated as 0. A negative index does not exceed the absolute $7,395 award ceiling.

Enrollment Intensity Adjustments
- Pro-Rata Disbursal: Payouts scale directly by credit hours instead of fixed part-time brackets (e.g., 9 credits pays exactly 75% of the baseline full-time scheduled tier).
- Year-Round Pell: Students can receive up to 150% of their annual award within a single year if taking courses over consecutive terms (e.g., Summer semester).

Official Portal
- StudentAid.gov Pell Portal

A Pell Grant is a subsidy the U.S. federal government provides for students who need it to pay for college. Federal Pell Grants are limited to students with exceptional financial need, who have not earned their first bachelor's degree, or who are enrolled in certain post-baccalaureate programs, through participating institutions. Originally known as a Basic Educational Opportunity Grant, it was renamed in 1980 in honor of U.S. senator Claiborne Pell to honor his central role in creating the program. A Pell Grant is generally considered the foundation of a student's financial aid package, to which other forms of aid are added. The Federal Pell Grant program is administered by the United States Department of Education, which determines the student's financial need and through it, the student's Pell eligibility. The U.S. Department of Education uses a standard formula to evaluate financial information reported on the Free Application for Federal Student Aid (FAFSA) for determining the student's Expected Family Contribution (EFC).

Pell Grants were created by the Higher Education Act of 1965. These federal funded grants are not loans, and need not be repaid. Students may use their grants at any one of approximately 5,400 participating postsecondary institutions. These federally funded grants help about 5.4 million full-time and part-time college and vocational school students nationally. As of the 2017–2018 academic year, the top three funded universities by total grant money were CUNY ($638 million), SUNY ($323 million), and the University of Phoenix ($197 million); three of the top ten funded colleges were for-profit colleges.

== History ==
Today, the Pell Grant program assists undergraduates of low-income families, who are actively attending universities and or other secondary institutions. However, before the Pell Grant became what it is today, it went through numerous changes.

In 1965, Congress passed the Higher Education Act of 1965 (HEA). President Lyndon B. Johnson implemented the HEA as a part of his administration's agenda to assist and improve higher education in the United States. It was the initial legislation to benefit lower- and middle-income students. The HEA program included not only grants but also low-interest loans to students who did not qualify for grants. Universities and other institutions, such as vocational schools, benefited as well from the HEA program, by receiving federal aid to improve the quality of the education process. Student aid programs administered by the US Department of Education are contained in Title IV of the HEA and so are called "Title IV Programs."

In 1972, Title IX Higher Education Amendments were a response to the distribution of aid in the current grant. Senator Claiborne Pell set forth the initial movements to reform the HEA. Lois Rice, an American corporate executive, scholar and education policy expert is known as the "mother of the Pell Grant" for her work lobbying for its creation. The Opportunity Grant Program (Basic Grant) was intended to serve as the "floor" or "foundation" of an undergraduate student's financial aid package. Other financial aid, to the extent that it was available, would be added to the Basic Grant up to the limit of a student's financial need. Most changes to the federal student aid program result from a process called reauthorization. Through the process of reauthorization, Congress examines the status of each program and decides whether to continue that program and whether a continued program requires changes in structure or purpose. Congress has reauthorized campus-based programs every five or six years, beginning in 1972.

In 1994, Congress passed the Violent Crime Control and Law Enforcement Act (VCCLEA), a provision of which revoked Pell Grant funding "to any individual who is incarcerated in any federal or state penal institution." A provision of this Act overturned a section of the Higher Education Act of 1965, which created the Pell Grant for postsecondary education. The provision reads, "No basic grant shall be awarded under this subpart to any individual who is incarcerated in any Federal or State penal institution." Prisoners first became eligible for basic grant funding in 1972. As the principal design of the Pell Grant was to help low-income individuals attain post-secondary education, including prisoners was consistent with the goal. The grant aimed to reach those who might not otherwise have an opportunity to enroll in college study or vocational training programs. Including prisoners for funding was based on the notion that higher education improved the lives of inmates, reduced recidivism, and contributed to a more orderly institution.

There has been some advocacy for reinstating Pell Grant funding for all prisoners who would qualify, despite their incarceration status, by members of the House of Representatives who introduced the Restoring Education and Learning Act (REAL Act) in the spring of 2014. At the executive level, the Obama administration backed a program at the Department of Education that would have allowed for a limited lifting of the ban for some prisoners called the Second Chance Pell Pilot.

The ban was lifted by the Consolidated Appropriations Act, 2021. The ability for prisoners to obtain Pell Grants would also be further strengthened under at the federal level under the Federal Student Aid (FAFSA) Simplification Act of 2022.

=== Higher Education Amendments of 1972 ===
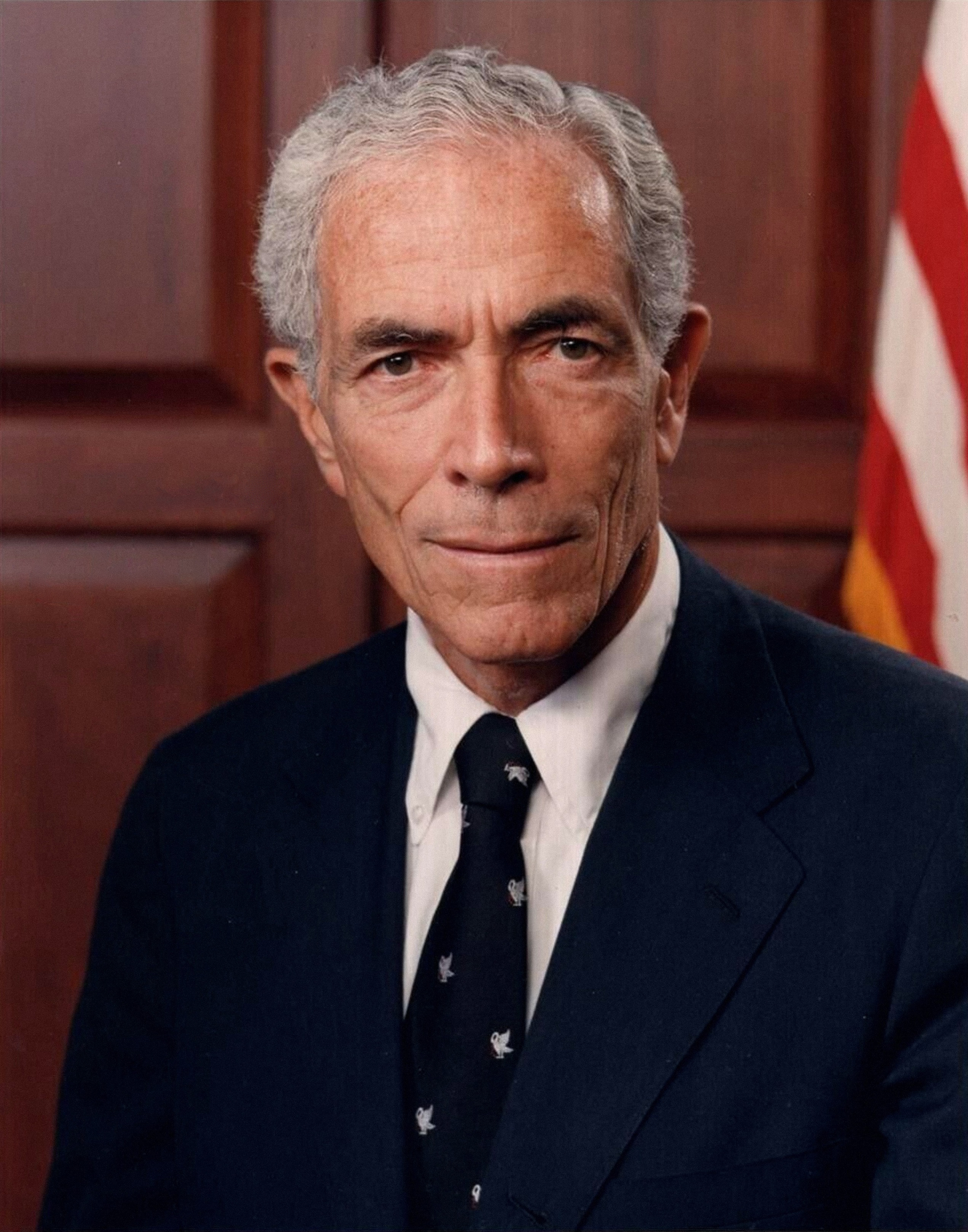
Claiborne Pell

The Higher Education Amendments of 1972 reauthorized the three campus-based programs, leaving the Economic Opportunity Grant Program with the same name, but renaming the two others: the National Defense Student Loan Program became the National Direct Student Loan or Federal Direct Student Loan Program and the Federal Supplemental Educational Opportunity Grant Program (SEOG). In addition, for-profit schools became eligible to use Title IV Funds. Also, the Educational Opportunity Grant Program was changed to no longer function as a stand-alone program of gift aid but instead was linked with the Basic Grant Program.

In 1978, the Middle Income Student Assistance Act of 1978 (MISAA) was signed into act by President Jimmy Carter. This bill provides more generous Basic Educational Opportunity Grants (i.e. Pell Grants) to low-income students, and makes students from families with incomes up to about $25,000 eligible. An additional 1.5 million students from middle-income families became eligible for the Basic Grants program.

=== Education Amendments of 1978 ===
Starting in 1978, families were able to borrow $300 a year for each dependent child in school regardless of income.

=== Recent legislation ===
Several changes to the program occurred in 2011. The maximum award amount for the 2011–2012 award year was $5,500. Despite a shortened application process, fewer funds for the 2011–2012 program could lead to financial problems for many students. The government funded the program at $17.1 billion from 2008 to 2010, as part of the American Recovery and Reinvestment Act of 2009. However, the additional funding does not match the needs of increasing numbers of students who enroll in college and qualify for aid through the recession. The Pell Grant program was subject to a $5.7 billion decrease in funding as part of a continuing resolution (H.R. 1), which cleared the House in February 2011 and cut about $60 billion from the federal budget. The changes would take effect for the 2011–2012 school year, decreasing the maximum amount of aid for the most needy students from $5,550 to $4,705 a year; in addition, about 1.7 million students who receive smaller Pell Grants would become ineligible for the program. Approval for the cuts is not certain because of long-standing bipartisan support from the Senate. As of April 6, 2011, funds have not been approved, as the Senate has not voted to pass this legislation. The program provided grants ranging from $555-$5,550 to over 9 million students in 2011–2012, with awards totaling $33,575,066,024.

In August 2022, President Joe Biden announced that up to $20,000 of debt would be canceled for Pell Grant recipients.

In 2023 and 2024, legislators in both houses of Congress introduced legislation to update, alter, or expand the Pell Grant Program.

- Promoting Employment and Lifelong Learning (PELL) Act: Introduced in July 2023 by Senator Ted Budd [R-NC], this act seeks to expand Pell Grant eligibility by establishing a sub grant in the “Workforce Pell Grants Program”. The program is designed to support students enrolled in short-term educational programs. It would cover programs that offer 150 to 600 hours of instructional time over an 8 to 15 week period. The legislation’s aim is to provide financial assistance to those pursuing a quick entry to the job market or wish to enhance their skills. As of July 20, 2023 this bill has been introduced to the Senate Committee on Health, Education, Labor, and Pensions.
- Pell Grant Preservation and Expansion Act of 2024: Introduced in mid-2024 by Senator Mazie K. Hirono (D-HI), this bill proposes an increase in the maximum Pell Grant award. Under this legislation, the maximum would increase from $7,395 to $10,000 for the 2025-2026 award year, alongside increases up to $14,000 over the next five years. After the 2025-2026 award year, the Pell Grant would be increased alongside inflation “…to make sure its purchasing power remains strong in future years.” As of June 20, 2024 this bill has been introduced to the Senate Committee on Health, Education, Labor, and Pensions.
- Degrees Not Debt Act of 2024: Introduced in February 2024 by Representative Salud O. Carbajal [D-CA-24], this act set the maximum Pell Grant award for the 2024-2025 and 2025-2026 award years at $14,800. It also has a provision to adjust the maximum award annually based on inflation starting for the 2026-2027 award year. As of February 29, 2024 this bill has been introduced to the House Committee on Education and the Workforce.

The One Big Beautiful Bill Act of July 2025 introduced substantial changes to student and institutional eligibility for Pell Grants. For one, applicants with a Student Aid Index exceeding twice the amount of the maximum Pell Grant award, as well as students who have received a federal aid loan that covers the entire cost of their attendance are now ineligible for Pell Grants. The legislation also expanded Pell Grant eligibility to cover students in short-term workforce training programs.

== Application ==
The application process requires the student and the student's family complete a Free Application for Federal Student Aid (FAFSA) form. The applicant should complete the FAFSA form for the first time prior to starting the freshman undergraduate year and then update the form each year as the applicant progresses through the college undergraduate term. The first step in applying for the Pell Grant is to complete or update the FAFSA form on or after October 1 of each year. If an applicant must correct a completed FAFSA form, it can be done in step 3 of the application, in the "Make corrections to a processed FAFSA" section. When the student completes or updates the FAFSA application, answers to questions determine eligibility for the Pell Grant, among other government grants and funding.

After the initial FAFSA application is submitted, the student is notified by email or regular postal delivery if funding is awarded. Copies of the confirmation sheet should be made for personal records.

In 2021, The FAFSA Simplification Act was enacted as a part of the Consolidated Appropriations Act of 2021. It required an overhaul of the federal student aid application process with the primary purpose of streamlining the application process and expanding access to the Pell Grant.

Key changes introduced by the act:

- Reduction in Application Questions: The FAFSA application went from 108 questions to 36, in an effort to make it easier for applicants and their families.
- Revised Need Analysis Formula: The methodology for calculated need was changed from the Expected Family Contribution (EFC) to the Student Aid Index (SAI). The SAI removes the number of family members in college from the calculation and has a minimum value of -1500 as compared to zero for the EFC.
- Expanded Pell Grant Eligibility: Eligibility is now linked to a student’s family size and the federal poverty level as of the 2024-2025 award year. Furthermore, incarcerated students regained access to the award starting in the 2024-2024 award year.

The Department of Education postponed the release of the new FAFSA from July 1, 2023 to July 1, 2024 to allow for continued work to address technical problems. The DoE formally released the application in December 2023. Further delays were intended to give students a smoother transition to the new application and to ensure that a more reliable system could be made.

Despite these efforts, the rollout faced a number of challenges. Technical errors and glitches slowed the initial release and led to delays in application processing causing confusion for applicants. The Government Accountability Office (GAO) said these problems were due in part to a lack of testing and poor leadership.

=== Eligibility ===
The U.S. Department of Education has a standard formula that it uses to evaluate the information that each person supplies when applying for the Pell Grant. The formula used was created by Congress from criteria submitted through the FAFSA form. The formula produces a number that is called the Expected Family Contribution (EFC), which determines the student's eligibility.

This grant requires each applicant to be an undergraduate student who has not yet earned a bachelor's degree, and a United States citizen or an eligible non-citizen (usually, a permanent resident). In addition, the applicant must have a high school diploma or a GED or be able to demonstrate the ability to benefit from the program. Applicants must also sign a statement certifying that they will use the aid only for education-related purposes, that they are not currently in default for any federal student loans, and that they owe no refund for any federal education grants.

The Pell Grant also requires that students maintain satisfactory academic progress in a degree-oriented program as defined by the school they attend. A person may be eligible if previously incarcerated but with limited eligibility, depending on the offense.

Students must not have an outstanding Pell overpayment on record. Additionally, an applicant may not receive Pell Grant funds from more than one college at a time.

=== Award amount ===
As with all grants, there is a maximum amount that the government funds for each applicant. The maximum amount for the 2022–2023 award year is $6,845. The maximum Federal Pell Grant for the 2023–24 award year (July 1, 2023, through June 30, 2024) is $7,395. The maximum amount of the grant usually depends on the EFC and several other factors, including cost of attendance, the amount of time the student plans to attend college, whether it is a full academic year, and whether one is a full-time or part-time student. Once one has been considered eligible, the money can be obtained a couple of ways: the student's school can apply Pell Grant funds to school costs, pay the student directly, usually by check, or combine these methods.

The school must tell the student in writing how much the award will be and how and when it will be paid, and it must disburse Pell Grant funds once a semester/term or twice during the academic year. Under certain circumstances, Pell funds can also be used to fund Career Pathways programs and support services.

== Uses of grant ==
Typically, the college first applies the grant or loan money toward a student's tuition, fees, and (if the student lives on campus) room and board. Any money left over is paid to the student for other expenses: books, living expenses if the student does not live on campus, and transportation.

== Impact ==
Students coming from low-income families already face increased challenges that hinder their ability to receive a higher education. The Pell Grant addresses one of the issues by making college accessible to students that may need the financial assistance. It has been shown to increase the college enrollment of students coming from lower and moderate-income families. It can also reduce the chances of them dropping out.

There have been advocacy efforts to reinstate prisoner eligibility for Pell grants as a preventative to re-incarceration. In 1997, one study on 3,200 prisoners in three states showed that receiving education while incarcerated reduced the likelihood of re-incarceration by 29 percent, according to Spearit, then a professor of law at the Thurgood Marshall School of Law. Lynn Novick, the director of the PBS documentary College Behind Bars, wrote in the Seattle Times in 2019 about how access to college education in prison was markedly reduced after President Clinton signed the Violent Crime Control and Law Enforcement Act in 1994, with the removal of Pell Grants as a central issue:

Higher education in prison was commonplace in America until 1994, when the Clinton Crime Bill banned federal Pell Grants for people in prison. Overnight, college behind bars was decimated. Privately funded programs like the one we visited, the Bard Prison Initiative (BPI), slowly sprang up, but they do not begin to fill the enormous need.

Novick argues that access to education may help reduce the high recidivism rates of 50-60% and reports that "of the 600 BPI alumni who have been released in the past 20 years, only 4% have gone back to prison."

== Appropriations ==
- Fiscal Year 2011 : $41,674,180,000
- Fiscal Year 2010 : $21,772,000,000
- Fiscal Year 2009 : $19,378,000,000
- Fiscal Year 2008 : $16,256,000,000
- Fiscal Year 2007 : $13,660,711,000

In 2025 and for the first time since 2012, the Congressional Budget Office (CBO) forecasts a $2.7 billion budget shortfall for the Pell Grant Program. With expected declines in enrollment due to the new FAFSA rollout, the CBO projected the program to have a surplus, and did not expect a shortfall till 2029. However, new eligibility requirements saw an increase in the number of Pell recipients by 12.9%. The CBO now projects that the program will be short nearly $10 billion by the 2026-2027 fiscal year.

== Awards information ==
2011

Amount of Aid Available: $35,772,935,000 Amount of Aid Available represents the amount of funds to be awarded to participants in this program. Number of New Awards Anticipated: 9,413,000 Average New Award: $3,800 Range of New Awards: $555–$5,550

2010

Amount of Aid Available: $32,295,226,000 Amount of Aid Available represents the amount of funds to be awarded to participants in this program. Number of New Awards Anticipated: 8,355,000 Average New Award: $3,865 Range of New Awards: $555–$5,550

2009

Amount of Aid Available: $25,328,889,000 Amount of Aid Available represents the amount of funds awarded to participants in the Federal Student Aid programs. Depending upon the program, this total may include federal appropriated dollars, institutional or state matching dollars, and federal or private loan capital. Number of New Awards Anticipated: 7,022,000 Average New Award: $3,611 Range of New Awards: $486–$5,350

2008

Amount of Aid Available: $16,428,110,000 Amount of Aid Available represents the amount of funds awarded to participants in the Federal Student Aid programs. Depending upon the program, this total may include federal appropriated dollars, institutional or state matching dollars, and federal or private loan capital. Number of New Awards Anticipated: 5,578,000 Average New Award: $2,945 Range of New Awards: $400–$4,731

2007

Amount of Aid Available: $13,989,305,000 Amount of Aid Available represents the amount of funds awarded to participants in the Federal Student Aid programs. Depending upon the program, this total may include federal appropriated dollars, institutional or state matching dollars, and federal or private loan capital. Number of New Awards Anticipated: 5,339,000 Average New Award: $2,620 Range of New Awards: $400–$4,310

== Federal Pell Grant lifetime eligibility calculator ==
The scheduled award is the maximum amount of Federal Pell Grant funding a student can receive is calculated for an award year. An award year is a period from July 1 of one calendar year to June 30 of the next year.

The scheduled award is partially determined using the student's expected family contribution (EFC), which the program calculates from the information the student and family provided in the Free Application for Federal Student Aid (FAFSA). The result is the maximum amount the student can receive for the award year if enrolled full-time for the full school year. It represents 100% of the Pell Grant eligibility for that award year.

To determine how much of the maximum six years (600%) of Pell Grant the student uses each year, the U.S. Department of Education (ED) compares the actual amount awarded for the award year with the scheduled award amount for that award year. A student who uses 100% receives the full award. A student might not receive the entire scheduled award for an award year, most commonly if the student did not enroll for the full year, did not enroll full-time, or both. If the student does not receive the full award, ED calculates the percentage of the scheduled award they received. Before the 2011-2012 Aid Year, the FAFSA limit was 18 semesters, but it was cut to 12 semesters by Congress.

ED tracks the Lifetime Eligibility Used by adding the percentages of the Pell Grant scheduled awards a student receives each award year.

== See also ==
- Student financial aid in the United States
