= Cost of attendance =

Term

In discussions of the cost of college in the United States, the cost of attendance (COA) (also known as the price of attendance) is a statutory term for the estimated full and reasonable cost of completing a full academic year (usually, nine months) as a full-time student. The cost of attendance is published by each educational institution and includes:

- Tuition and fees payable to the institution
- Books and supplies
- Room and board
- Personal costs (medical, toiletries, clothing, laundry)
- Transportation to and from the school

The cost of attendance is usually divided into direct and indirect costs. Direct costs include expenses billed by the educational institutions, such as tuition, fees, and on-campus housing. Indirect costs refer to estimated expenses not billed by the institutions, including transportation, personal expenses, and off-campus living costs.

As of October 29, 2011, every post-secondary institution that receives federal financial aid funds is required to post its COA. Colleges are also required to post a Net Price Calculator, that determines for each prospective or current student a personalized Net Price, which is the COA minus need- and merit-based grant aid (not including loans or work-study programs).

Financial aid cannot exceed the cost of attendance.

== Cost of attendance in the United States ==
In the United States, private and public educational institutions use relatively similar models of calculating the cost of attendance, however, private institutions generally have a higher cost of attendance. Research from the College Board showed that for the 2019 to 2020 academic year, the average cost for an out-of-state student to attend a public four year university was $38,330, while the average in-state cost was $21,950. A student attending a private four year university has an average yearly cost of $49,870. These costs factor in tuition, housing, food, university fees, and supplies such as textbooks, manuals, and uniforms. Two year public universities, such as a community college, factor in tuition and fees, and have an average yearly cost of $3,730. The average tuition and fees for for-profit institutions were 14,600.

=== Trends of US educational costs ===
For most public and private universities in the United States, there has been a drastic increase in the cost of attendance. Many of these institutions increase their costs annually beyond that of economic inflation. Trends have shown that compared to today, colleges, public and private, cost double of what is expected from economic inflation. Camilo Maldonado, a graduate of the Harvard Business School and writer for Forbes, detailed this issue:

“The average for all four-year institutions comes out to $26,120 per year. This brings the total cost of attendance to an astronomical total of $104,480 over four years. The comparable cost for the same four-year degree in 1989 was $26,902 ($52,892 adjusted for inflation)."

— Camilo Maldonado (2018)

The National Center for Educational Statistics did a cost analysis over a ten-year period. It found that between 2006 and 2017, undergraduate tuition, fees, room, and board rose by 31 percent and 24 percent at public and non-profit institutions, respectively, adjusting for inflation.

A lot of these issues have contributed to what is known as the higher education bubble.

The US Department of Education, has attributed the increase in college costs mainly to less aid received from federal government, the university needing to maintain rankings by keeping facilities up to date, and receiving less endowment over the years.

Various attempts have been made to combat increasing tuition costs. The University of Evansville, a private institution in Indiana, attempted to combat this issue by issuing a tuition freeze, according to Nick Anderson from The Washington Post, “market pressures related to the nation's economic anxieties are starting to put a lid on sticker price at private schools. In 2012, an unprecedented number of private colleges cut or froze tuition -- more than 30 in all, by one national count. Many more sharply limited their increases to rates below the norm. Typically, tuition rises at a rate well above inflation.” This initiative is to help students better afford universities and to give an opportunity to students who are of lower socioeconomic status. The president of the University of Evansville, Tom Kazee, stated that “Without a freeze, some families in his region (Indiana/Illinois/Kentucky) won't even look at the school, even though it offers institutional grants to the vast majority of its 2,350 full-time undergraduate students.” One of the many critics of having a tuition freeze pointed out that "freezing or cutting the sticker price reduces the revenue schools have to help students in financial need".

University presidents and the board members of higher educational institutions often despise a freeze, actively attempting to prevent freezes from getting passed, as they are seen more as a temporary marketing stunt and less as a permanent solution to rising university costs.

To help students with the increase in cost, a solution that was proposed by universities and the US Government alike revolve around providing financial aid to students, in the form of grants. A good portion of tuition cost raised from an increase in annual tuition, as shown by data from the University of Florida, is used to provide financial aid. Zaragoza from the Orlando Sentinel found: “The increase is expected to generate about $1.4 million in additional money for UCF, about 30 percent of which will go toward financial aid for needy students."

The National Center for Educational Statistics found that 85 percent of full time undergraduate students in the United States applied some form of financial aid for their educational during the 2016 to 2017 school year. Their data further showed that this was a 10 percent increase from the 2000 to 2001 school year, showing that more students have applied for financial aid to help cover their expenses.

The US Department of Education suggests decreasing the inefficient use of resources to reduce annual cost increases. It proposes that using technology to streamline the operational aspects of the university, forming new partnerships within the university and other private sector organizations and businesses to increase efficiency in daily operation, and better manage the increasing labor costs of the university. Applying some or all of these recommended measure to reduce the costs can benefit the student as less revenue would be needed to offset the cost, and help to tame rising tuition costs.

==== Effects of increase in cost ====
The rising cost of education could have a detrimental impact on students. Financially, graduates would be set back later in life, having the inability to purchase goods, raise a family, or have financial security. The rising cost can follow graduates much later on in life towards retirement age. The United States Supreme Court, in Lockhart v. United States (2005) found in a unanimous decision that the federal government can withhold Social Security payments in order to collect any student loan debt, even if the debt had been outstanding for more than ten years. Graduates with extortionate student debt enter professions that have decreasing payouts when adjusted for inflation and the generalized cost of living. Rising cost and the inability to repay their debt negatively impacts the health of students. A study by Roderick Jones from the Sociological Inquiry “showed student loan debt had a significant and negative association with suicide for people ages 20–24 and 25–34.” That is, increasing student loan debt has shown to have a strong correlation with suicide rates.

Some individuals choose to not attend a university, which would very detrimental impacts for their overall quality of life. Having a degree from a college or university has been an important step for social mobility within the United States. Dr. Bridget Terry Long, a professor of education and economics at the Harvard Graduate School of Education, found that “individuals with at least some college education make more money than those with only a high school degree.” Furthermore, Long showed how the non-monetary returns between non-college educated and college educated individuals was even greater, as graduates have “better working conditions, lower rates of disability, and increased civic engagement”.

== See also ==
- Higher education bubble
