= Federal Work-Study Program =

Help for students to earn funds

The Federal Work-Study Program, originally called the College Work-Study Program and in the United States frequently referred to as just "Work-Study", is a federally funded program in the United States that assists students with the costs of post-secondary education. The Federal Work-Study Program helps students earn financial funding through a part-time employment program. Approximately 3,400 institutions participate in the program.

== Program outline ==
The Federal Work-Study Program provides a method for postsecondary education students to earn funds that are used toward their education. The program was formerly known as the College Work-Study Program. The FWS program helps students earn monetary awards towards their postsecondary education. The program is limited to students with financial need, whose Expected Family Contribution is less than the cost of attendance.

Eligible college students join work programs through their college. There are many different types of jobs that qualify for the program, and they vary significantly from one college to another. Students are assured of receiving at least federal minimum wage for the duration of their employment. The FWS program helps to ensure that college students who are truly in need of the money get the jobs.

Federal Work-Study provides part-time jobs for undergraduate and graduate students with financial need, allowing them to earn money to help pay education expenses. The program encourages community service work and work related to the recipient's course of study.

== Process ==
Federal Work Study funding is given to institutions to provide part-time work opportunities for students involved in certain majors. Federal funding is made to participating institutions based on requests made by the institutions. A statutory formula is used to help institutions determine the allocations to request. Once funds are allocated to each university, they then administer the funds. Once all the funds for the institution have been allocated no more students can participate that year.

Students can apply for the Federal Work Study Program if they have financial need (see Expected Family Contribution). The students must file the Free Application for Federal Student Aid (FAFSA) to qualify.

Each institution provides its own restrictions on the way it allocates funds. The institution provides a number of different types of jobs both in their own institution as well as through private employers. The federally funded program encourages institutions to use the funds to help give back to the community. At least 7% of the jobs offered must be helping the community. Some of the jobs offered are often reading tutors for young children, literacy tutors and mathematics tutors. Other jobs can be on campus such as working in the library or student center or performing administrative functions in the office.

Some institutions may have restrictions on the number of hours per week that students can work. Also, there may be restrictions that pertain to the student's grade point average. For example, if a student's grade point average slips below a certain point, the college may not allow the student to work through the FWS program.

== Qualifying for FWS ==
In order to qualify for the Federal Work Study Program students must apply for federal assistance through the Free Application for Federal Student Aid (FAFSA) program. The program is open to both undergraduate and graduate students.

The Free Application for Federal Student Aid is open to all students who have need. The program will determine if students qualify and how much money they will receive. The FWS program is administered through the student's school. Each school has a different amount of funds available to give out for the program.

Generally, International or foreign students do not qualify for the Federal Work-Study program.

Students must be one of the following to receive federal student aid:

- U.S. citizen
- U.S. national (includes natives of American Samoa or Swains Island)
- U.S. permanent resident who has an I-151, I-551, or I-551C (Permanent Resident Card).

If students are not in one of these categories, they must have an Arrival-Departure Record (I-94) from U.S. Citizenship and Immigration Services (USCIS) showing one of the following designations:

- Refugee
- Asylum Granted
- Cuban-Haitian Entrant, Status Pending
- Conditional Entrant (valid only if issued before April 1, 1980)
- Victims of human trafficking, T-visa holder or child of a T-1 visa holder.
- Parolee: Students must be paroled into the United States for at least one year and must be able to provide evidence from the USCIS that they are in the United States for other than a temporary purpose and that they intend to become a U.S. citizen or permanent resident.

== Applying for FWS ==
The Free Application for Federal Student Aid (FAFSA) is required. The applicant's financial need will be determined based on their application. The students may be employed by any number of places including a federal, state or local agency, a private organization or by the institution itself.

If the student indicates an interest in FWS on their FAFSA, their FAFSA result will inform them of their FWS award (if any) along with their FAFSA award (if any).

If the student does not indicate an interest in FWS on their FAFSA, they can still apply for FWS. They do this by applying for a job through their own school. Each institution has limited FWS funds (which may be first-come-first-served), and each institution sets its own procedure and its own deadline to apply for these funds (which may be earlier than the FAFSA deadline).

== Department of Education on FWS ==
The US Department of Education said not all schools in the United States take part in the Federal Work-Study Program. One of the reasons is these institutions do not have sufficient funds for qualified students. An award does not guarantee the student a job. The awardees must find a work-study job to earn the funds. Some schools match their students with potential employment offers but many require their enrollees to apply and interview for vacant positions. The program is not guaranteed every school year. Students are advised to get in touch with their respective schools for specific awards criteria. The jobs can be inside or outside the campus. The type of work can be anything like assisting in the financial aid office or serving as research assistant. Off campus, options can be working for a public office or private not for profit organization. Some schools collaborate with private employers for work-study jobs.

== See also ==
- Cooperative education
- Manual labor college
- Student financial aid
