= Expected family contribution =

Algorithm to estimate U.S. students' ability to pay for tuition

In the post-secondary education system of the United States, an expected family contribution (EFC) is an estimate of a student's, and for a dependent student, their parent(s)' or guardian(s)', ability to pay the costs of a year of post-secondary education. The EFC is used in the United States student financial aid process to determine an applicant's eligibility for need-based federal student aid. In most cases, the same estimate is also used for state and institutional (college-based) financial aid. The EFC is included on the Student Aid Report and Institutional Student Information Record, which are sent after filing a form called a Free Application for Federal Student Aid (FAFSA).

There are a number of free calculators on the Web to help applicants estimate the EFC before filing the FAFSA. Recipients of need-based financial aid must reapply for each year by completing a new FAFSA.

The term and concept of Expected Family Contribution was replaced by the term Student Aid Index (SAI) in 2024. While the minimum EFC was zero, the SAI can be a negative number as low as -1500.

== Use of the expected family contribution ==
The federal government does not distribute aid directly to the student or the student's family; it goes through the college. Colleges use the student's federal student aid eligibility and combine it with state financial aid (if any) and their own aid to create a financial aid package for the student. Generally speaking, the lower the EFC, the higher the financial aid award will be. Zero is the lowest EFC number (indicating that the family cannot afford to pay anything) and 999,999 is the highest.

Some relatively wealthy colleges and universities use another method called the CSS Profile, or have their own form, to calculate their own version of an EFC, which they use in distributing the college's aid. A major difference between the FAFSA and the CSS Profile is that the CSS Profile includes primary residence home equity when determining the ability of the family to pay, while the FAFSA does not.

The EFC is subtracted from the cost of attendance (COA) of the college or university to determine a student's financial need. If COA > EFC, then a student is considered to have a financial need.

== Calculation of the EFC ==
=== Basic considerations ===
The formula for computing the EFC changes each year. It is different for each of three categories of student (dependent students, independent students without dependents other than a spouse, and independent students with dependents other than a spouse) and is published in the Federal Register. An Department of Education document explaining how the EFC is determined was 36 pages long in 2017. It considers income, family size, living expenses, and family and student savings. If the student is a dependent, the student's savings and income, if any, are considered highly available to pay for college. A student with a college savings fund in his or her name will have a higher EFC (if not qualifying for an automatic zero), and will thus receive less need-based aid.

=== Automatic Zero and Simplified Needs EFC ===
- Automatic Zero: A student's EFC is set to zero if the family's income is below $26,000 for the 2017–2018 year and
  - they either received funding from any of the Federal Benefits programs (SSI, SNAP (formerly known as the Food Stamp program), WIC, or Free/Reduced Price Lunch), OR
  - they filed or were eligible to file a 1040A, 1040EZ, or were not required to fill out a tax return, OR
  - the parent is a dislocated worker.
- Simplified Needs Test: Families meeting the above requirements except for having income between $26,000 and $50,000 are eligible for the Simplified Needs Test, in which assets are not used in the calculation.
- Independent students without dependents other than a spouse are not eligible for the Automatic Zero or Simplified Needs.

=== Considerations that reduce the EFC ===
Items that lower a student's EFC:

- Additional family members supported by the head of the household (e.g., siblings or grandparents who are living at home)
- Additional family members in college. (The EFC is split among the students in college.)
- Lower income (especially student income)
- Fewer assets (especially student assets)

Colleges or universities have the legal authority to lower the EFC if there are unusual circumstances, usually brought to the financial aid office's attention as the result of an appeal of a financial aid award. These circumstances include:

- Loss of employment
- Loss of child support, alimony, etc.
- Separation or divorce
- Death of parent or spouse
- Large medical or dental expenses not covered by insurance
- Income that was abnormally high because of a one-time lump sum that will most likely not occur again

=== Financial issues that are not considered ===
Aspects that are not considered in the calculation of the EFC are:

- The equity in the family's principal home. (Additional homes and other real estate holdings are counted.)
- Parental retirement funds, such as 401ks
- Consumer debt, such as car and credit card loans

== Actual family payments ==
A common misconception is that the EFC is a statement of what the family actually will pay. This is usually not the case, and many families pay more, sometimes much more, than the EFC. The college's costs, minus the EFC, gives the student's financial need. Most four-year colleges do not have enough financial aid to meet students' needs, and as a result, the unmet need must be paid by the parents, in addition to the EFC. The federal government offers unsubsidized Stafford Loans, which are available to any family regardless of need, as a source of funds to cover the unmet need.

In cases in which a student qualifies for merit-based (rather than need-based) financial aid, the student and their family may pay less than the EFC.

A well-to-do family's EFC may exceed the cost of attendance at a school, and in that case the student does not have financial need, as defined by the federal financial aid system.

In some cases, despite financial hardship for the student, the student's family will simply be unwilling to pay the full amount, leaving the student to find their own way to finance their college education, or forgo it.

== Independent and dependent students ==
Students who are unmarried, younger than 24, and not supporting a minor child are categorized as Dependent Students, and the parents' income and assets are used in determining the EFC. Even if the parents have no intention of helping pay the student's college expenses, which legally they are not required to do, the student remains considered a dependent and the parents' income and assets are used in determining the EFC and through it, the student's financial aid award. Put differently, if the parents are able but unwilling to help pay for the student's college, financial aid will not be increased because of it. This was determined by the United States Congress.

In exceptional cases, such as parental child abuse and parental communication with the child being prohibited by a court, the college financial aid office has the authority to change a student's status from Dependent to Independent.

== See also ==
- FAFSA
- Student financial aid in the United States
