= Les Perelman =

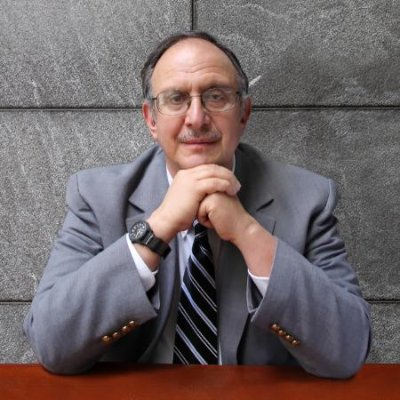
- Born: Leslie Cooper Perelman; 1948; Los Angeles, California, U.S.
- Died: November 12, 2025 (aged 77)
- Education: University of California, Berkeley (BA); University of Massachusetts Amherst (MA, PhD)
- Occupation: Educator
- Known for: Criticism of standardized testing

Leslie Cooper Perelman (1948–12 November 2025) was an American scholar and authority on writing assessment. He was a critic of automated essay scoring (AES), and influenced the College Board's decision to terminate the Writing Section of the SAT.

Perelman was a research affiliate at the Massachusetts Institute of Technology (MIT). Perelman taught writing and composition at MIT, where he served as Director of Writing Across the Curriculum and an Associate Dean of Undergraduate Education. He was an executive committee member of the Conference on College Composition and Communication. and co-chair of its Committee on Assessment.

== Teaching ==
Perelman taught in and directed writing programs at Tulane University and the University of Southern California. At MIT, he taught writing and composition and served as the director of Writing Across the Curriculum and an Associate Dean in the Office of Undergraduate Education.

== Criticism of essay scoring ==
=== SAT ===
Following his 2005 study of essay samples as well as graded essays provided by the College Board for reference on the writing portion of the SAT, Perelman reported a high correlation between an essay's length and score. He also noted that the essays were not penalized for any factual inaccuracies.

In 2013, Perelman met with David Coleman, the incoming president of the College Board, and an outcome of that conversation was Coleman's decision to abolish the mandatory SAT Writing Section.

=== Automatic scoring ===
In 2012, Perelman demonstrated that long, pretentious essays could achieve higher scores from the ETS scoring engine e-Rater as opposed to well written essays. In 2014, Perelman collaborated with students at MIT and Harvard to develop BABEL, the "Basic Automatic B.S. Essay Language" Generator. The nonsense essays generated by BABEL are claimed to perform well when graded by AES systems. Automated graders, Perelman argues, "cannot read meaning, and they cannot check facts. More to the point, they cannot tell gibberish from lucid writing."

Perelman's work is cited by the NCTE in their Position Statement on Machine Scoring, which expresses similar concerns about the limitations of AES:

Computer scoring systems can be "gamed" because they are poor at working with human language, further weakening the validity of their assessments and separating students not on the basis of writing ability but on whether they know and can use machine-tricking strategies.

== Influence on Australian Educational Testing ==
During 2017-2018, Perelman was commissioned by the New South Wales Teachers Federation to write three reports to assist in efforts to reform Australia's national primary and secondary school assessments, the National Assessment Program – Literacy and Numeracy (NAPLAN). His work was a major factor in the decision of the National Education Council to overrule the Federal Education Minister and prevent the use of Automated Essay Scoring for the writing portion of the NAPLAN tests.
