= Scholarship America =

Nonprofit education organization

- Founded: 1958
- Founder: Irving A. Fradkin
- Founded at: Fall River, Massachusetts
- Type: Educational
- Location: Minneapolis Minnesota
- Key people: Mike Nylund (President & CEO)
- Website: https://scholarshipamerica.org

Scholarship America is a Minnesota-based American philanthropic organization that designs, administers and manages scholarship and emergency aid assistance to support students facing financial barriers to higher education.

== History ==
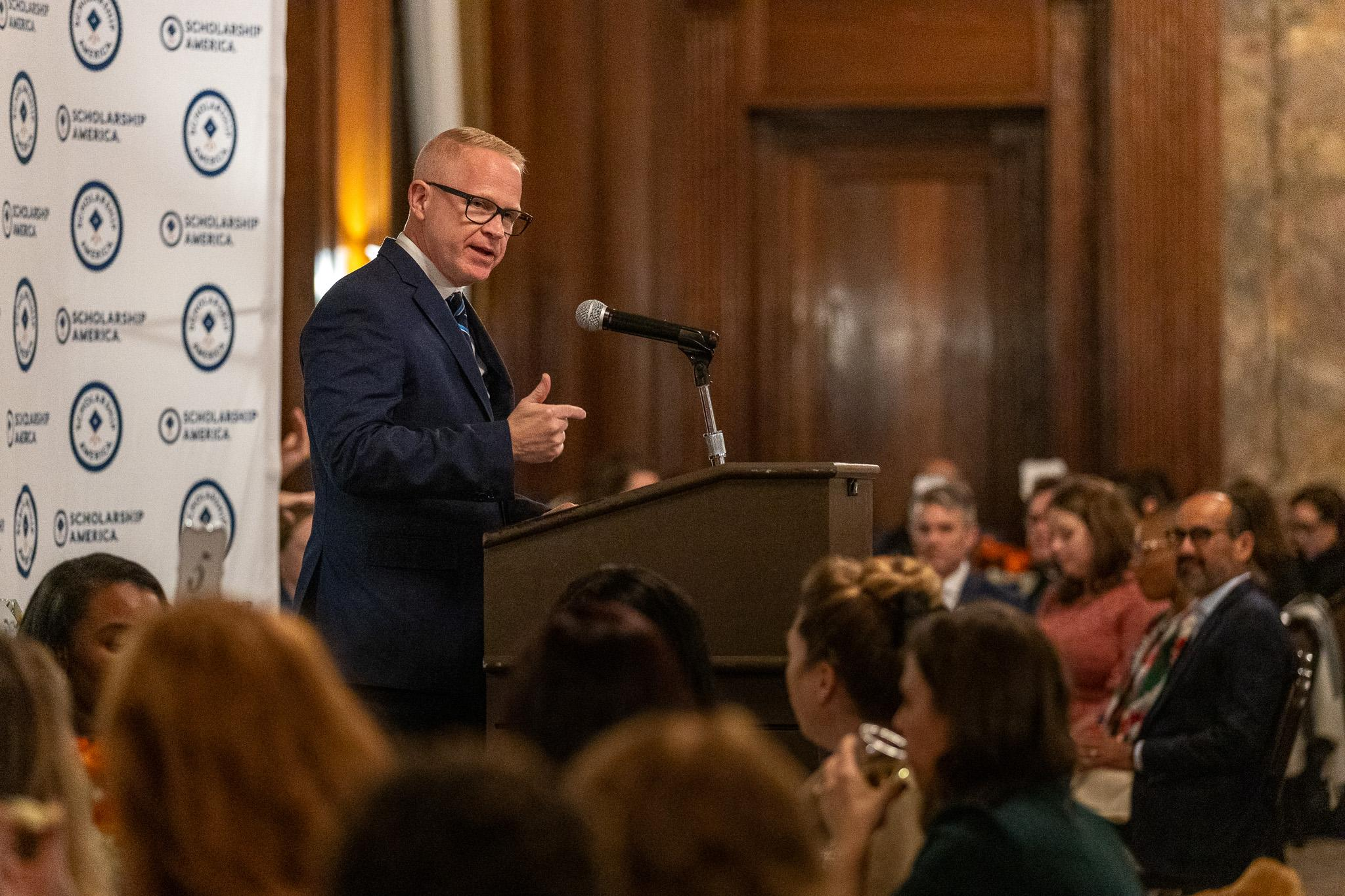
Scholarship America CEO Mike Nylund

Scholarship American was founded in 1958 by Irving A. Fradkin, an optometrist in Fall River, Massachusetts. It was initially named Dollars for Scholars before being officially chartered and incorporated as a 501(c)(3) organization under the name of Citizens' Scholarship Foundation of America (CSFA) in May 1961. During its early years, CSFA's headquarters moved from Fall River to Boston, and then to Concord, New Hampshire. It opened its first regional office in St. Peter, Minnesota, in 1976, thanks to a grant from the Bush Foundation.

The organization supports a number of education programs designed to improve student success, career advancement and educational outcomes. The organization's first program was Dollars for Scholars, a nationwide coalition of local scholarship organizations. Also in 1976, CSFA expanded from its work with community-based organizations with the establishment of Scholarship Management Services (SMS), a branch of the organization designed to manage corporate scholarships. The Toro company of Minnesota became SMS's first client.

In 1984, the organization's board voted to move CSFA's headquarters to St. Peter, Minnesota, where they remain today. That year, CSFA reached the $5 million mark in terms of scholarship funds distributed. Throughout the 1980s and early 1990s, the organization grew rapidly and launched its Collegiate Partner initiative, in which colleges agreed to maximize CSFA-related aid to students on their campuses, and ScholarShop program, a junior high and high school college-readiness curriculum. In September 2001, CSFA created the Families of Freedom Scholarship Fund after the September 11 attacks on New York City and Washington, D.C. to benefit the dependents of those killed or permanently disabled in the attacks, rescue and cleanup efforts. The fund raised more than $100 million with President Bill Clinton and Senator Bob Dole as co-chairs of the fundraising campaign.

On January 1, 2003, CSFA changed its name to Scholarship America. Scholarship America also administers several special scholarship initiatives, including the Dreamkeepers Emergency Financial Aid program for community college students. The organization awards the Scholarship America Dream Award, a multi-year, performance-based scholarship fund targeted toward postsecondary completion. The Dream Award program received its initial funding from proceeds from Katie Couric's book, The Best Advice I Ever Got: Lessons from Extraordinary Lives.

In 2024, the organization presented the inaugural Irving Innovation Awards.

As of 2025, the organization has awarded over $5.7 billion to 3.2 million students.

Scholarship America's president and CEO is Mike Nylund.

=== Partnerships ===
The organization partners with corporations and organizations to sponsor over 1,350 scholarship and education assistance programs for students. Its sponsorship partners include PepsiCo, Amazon, Wells Fargo, Chick-fil-A, American Water, and Dunkin', and grantmaking foundations including Gitlab Foundation, Ascendium, ECMC Foundation, CLA Foundation, and Crimsonbridge.

It is also supported by donor-advised funds.

== Recognition ==
Scholarship America has been highly rated by Charity Navigator. In 2024, Forbes ranked it as the 78th largest U.S. charity.

The Chronicle of Philanthropy recognized the organization as one of America's largest nonprofits as part of its Philanthropy 400, ranking it #158 in 2014. In 2013, the Minneapolis/St. Paul Business Journal recognized Scholarship America as Minnesota's second-largest charity.

Katie Couric has supported the organization, and featured it on her talk show, Katie, twice: to celebrate its founder, Fradkin, and to announce the first class of Dream Award recipients.

== See also ==
- Jefferson Dollars for Scholars, chapter of Scholarship America
