= Student financial aid in the United States =

Assistance for paying for education in the U.S.

Student financial aid in the United States is funding that is available exclusively to students attending a post-secondary educational institution in the United States. This funding is used to assist in covering the many costs incurred in pursuing post-secondary education. Financial aid is available from federal and state governments, educational institutions, and private organizations. It can be awarded through grants, loans, work-study, and scholarships. To apply for federal financial aid, students must first complete the Free Application for Federal Student Aid (FAFSA).

The financial aid process has been criticized for its part in enrollment management, whereby students are awarded money not based on merit or need, but on the maximum the student families will pay.

== Types of financial aid ==
=== Grants ===
In the United States, grants come from a wide range of government departments, colleges, universities or public and private trusts. Grant eligibility is typically determined by financial need. The application process is set by the agency providing the funds and often relies on data submitted via the FAFSA.

While the terms grant and scholarship are frequently used interchangeably, there is a difference. Scholarships may have a financial need component but rely on other criteria as well. Some private need-based awards are confusingly called scholarships and require the results of a FAFSA (the family's EFC). However, scholarships are often merit-based, while grants tend to be need-based.

Some examples of grants commonly applied for in the U.S.:

- Federal Pell Grant, the largest of the federal grant options and based exclusively on an individual's Expected Family Contribution as calculated using the FAFSA data.
- For students attending a university or Cal State in the state of California there are also resources like the Cal Grant award that is awarded every year. Cal Grants help students choose an institution that best suits them and not based on what they can afford. There are different types of grants that the California Student Aid Commission awards to different students. For example, Cal Grant A provides full mandatory tuition and feeds to students. Funds from Cal Grant B are given to eligible low-income and underprivileged students. For first-year students, an amount of up to $1,648 for books and living expenses were provided in the school year 2023–24. The California Student Aid Commission awards different amounts depending on the student's need.
- Federal Supplemental Educational Opportunity Grant (FSEOG), a federal grant program that is need-based, but directed towards students whose FAFSA results exhibit exceptional financial need, such as being among the lowest Expected Family Contribution (EFC).
- The Teacher Education Assistance for College and Higher Education (TEACH) Grant requires taking certain classes to get the grant, followed by performing a specific job, sometimes in a specific location, to keep the grant from becoming a loan.
- Institutional Grants, grants provided by educational institutions. Some institutional grants are based on academic achievement (merit awards or merit scholarships), while others are based on financial need, and some are a combination of the two.
- Private and Employer Grants, grants provided by the private sector, for students who meet specific criteria for eligibility related to the private organization.
- State Grants, are public funds received from state agencies that are completely separate from those listed in the federal sector. These grants vary by state and are awarded based on financial need.

=== Education loans ===
An education loan is a loan taken out by the student (or parent) to pay for educational expenses. Unlike scholarships and grants, this money must be repaid with interest. Educational loan options include federal student loans, federal parent loans, private loans, and consolidation loans.

==== Federal student loan programs ====
Federal student loans are loans directly to the student; the student is responsible for repayment of the loan. These loans typically have low interest rates and do not require a credit check or any other sort of collateral. Student loans provide a wide variety of deferment plans, as well as extended repayment terms, making it easier for students to select payment methods that reflect their financial situation. There are federal loan programs that consider financial need.

===== Direct subsidized loans =====
Direct subsidized loans are the most sought, as they have few requirements other than enrollment and demonstration of financial need. However, the amount that can be borrowed is determined by the school and may not exceed the financial need, which is based on the EFC using information from FAFSA. It is not required to begin repaying these loans while the student are in school at least part-time. They also have a six-month grace period after leaving the school. These loans also offer a deferment period in some cases.

===== Direct unsubsidized loans =====
Direct Unsubsidized Loans are available to all undergraduate and graduate students, with no requirement to demonstrate financial need. The school determines how much can be borrowed based on the cost of attendance and adjust for any other financial aid the student is receiving. However, the interest must be paid on these loans even during school. Interests that are not paid during enrollment accrue and are added to the principal amount of the loan.

===== Parent loans =====
Federal parent loans are a federally funded loan option if the student is dependent on his or her parents. Parent loans allow parents to take out student loans, the repayment of which will be their responsibility. The parents use these loans to pay for educational expenses on behalf of the student. For undergraduate students, there is the parent loan for undergraduate students or PLUS Loan. This loan allows parents to borrow up to the total cost of attendance, minus any other financial aid the student receives. Eligibility will be determined upon review of the parent's credit history.

==== Private loans ====
Private student loans are offered by private lenders (financial institutions). These loans typically have much higher interest rates, have fewer repayment/deferment options, cannot be discharged through bankruptcy, and are not supervised by any agency.

==== Consolidation loans ====
Consolidation loans combine two or more student and/or parent loans into one loan. They are an option for those who find themselves struggling with multiple student loan payments. Consolidation loans are available for most federal loan types, and some private lenders offer private consolidation loans for private education loans.

=== Work-study ===
The Federal Work-Study Program is a form of financial aid. Work-study jobs allow students to get campus jobs, when possible within their field of interest, and are more flexible than off-campus part-time jobs because they are designed to accommodate student schedules. In 2022, Williams College became the first institution of higher education in the United States to eliminate work-study (along with loans) from their financial aid programs by offering an "all grant" financial aid package.

=== Scholarships ===
While the terms grant and scholarship are frequently used interchangeably, there is a difference. Scholarships may have a financial need component but rely on other criteria as well. Some private need-based awards are confusingly called scholarships and require the results of a FAFSA (the family's EFC). However, scholarships are often merit-based, while grants tend to be need-based.

Scholarships, similar to grants, do not need to be repaid. Scholarships come from state, educational institutions, and private agencies. Scholarships can be awarded based on merit, financial need, student characteristics (such as gender, race, religion, family and medical history, and the like), creativity, career field, college, and athletic ability, among other categories.

There are search engines available to find scholarships such as Peterson's, Unigo, Fastweb, Cappex, Chegg, The College Board, and Niche (formerly known as College Prowler).

== Financial aid application process ==
=== The student's financial "need" ===
In the college financial aid process in the United States, a student's "need" is a figure that colleges use when calculating how much financial aid to offer a student. It is determined by taking the college's Cost of Attendance, which current rules require each college to specify. Then it is subtracted the student's Expected Family Contribution, based on the student's income and assets, and calculated by the U.S. Department of Education under rules set by Congress and processed using the FAFSA system. For unmarried students under 24, Congress mandates that parental income and assets be included. The resulting figure is the student's "need". Colleges attempt to provide students with enough financial aid to meet all student need, but in most cases are unable to do so completely. The result is "unmet need".

Under federal law, if there are special circumstances such as loss of a job or large medical expenses, college financial aid offices have considerable liberty to lower a student's calculated need, thus resulting in a larger aid award.

=== Application process for need-based aid ===
To qualify for need-based aid a student must have a significant amount of financial need, which is determined by the federal government based on the FAFSA. Using the information submitted on the FAFSA, the U.S. Department of Education calculates a figure called the Expected Family Contribution (EFC). If the EFC is less than the cost of attending a college, the student has a financial need (as the term is used in the U.S. financial aid system).

Students can file an appeal with their college financial aid office to seek additional financial aid, though the information about the process is not always clear or available online. SwiftStudent, a free service, provides template letters for college students.

Some well-to-do colleges have need-based aid of their own to distribute, in addition to federal and state aid (if any). These colleges require, in addition to the FAFSA, the CSS Profile financial form, which goes into greater detail.

=== Need-based aid ===
Need-based financial aid is awarded based on the financial need of the student. The "need" of each student is a figure determined separately for each student. The Free Application for Federal Student Aid application (FAFSA) is generally used for determining federal, state, and institutional need-based aid eligibility. At private institutions, a supplemental application may be necessary for institutional need-based aid.

A recent trend shows that what is purely need-based aid is not entirely clear. According to the National Postsecondary Aid Survey (NPSAS), SAT scores affect the size of institutional need-based financial aid. If a student has a high SAT score and a low family income, they will receive larger institutional need-based grants than a student with a low family income that has low SAT scores. In 1996, public higher education institutions gave students with high SAT scores and a low family income $1,255 in need-based grants. However, only $565 in need-based grants were given to students with low SAT scores who had low family incomes. The lower a student's SAT score, the smaller the amount of need-based grants a student received no matter what their family income level was. The same trend holds true for higher education private institutions. In 1996, private institutions gave students with high SAT scores and a low family income $7,123 versus $2,382 for students with low SAT scores and a low family income. Thus, "institutional need-based awards are less sensitive to need and more sensitive to 'academic merit' than the principles of needs analysis would lead us to expect." It has been found that increasing an SAT score in the range of 100-200 points can result in hundreds of dollars more in institutional grants and on average substantially more if one is attending a private institution.

While providing financial information to the government is a reasonable expectation to calculate a student's financial need, it does not necessarily follow that colleges should have access to this information. Providing that information to schools may be problematic because schools learn about students' other sources of funding and may adjust their financial aid packages accordingly. There is an asymmetric information problem since schools have full knowledge of their customers' ability to pay while students and their families have little information about costs that colleges face to provide their services. That is, when planning for the next academic year, a school will know its current and projected costs as well as each student's ability to pay after receiving state and federal grants. According to the Center for College Affordability and Productivity (CCAP), "If the federal or state authorities increase financial support per student, the institution has the opportunity to capture part or all of that increased ability to pay by reducing institutional grants and/or raising their charges for tuition, fees, room, or board." Importantly, it also notes that "the exception to this general pattern is modest aid targeted at only low-income students, like the Pell grant." The center uses data about net proceeds (tuition plus room, board and other fees) as a percentage of median income to show that financial aid practices have not been effective in decreasing prices in an effort to increase access. Net proceeds at public four-year institutions rose from 15% to 20% of median income from 1987 to 2008. In that same time, productivity has declined in the form of lighter teaching loads for professors and increased expenditures on administrative staff.

=== Non-need-based financial aid ===
Non-need-based loans are available for students and families who cannot afford to pay the entire cost of college. These loans are directed toward those individuals and families who did not qualify for need-based loans due to the amount of their personal assets. There is usually a higher interest rate associated with non-need-based loans. Because these loans are not need-based, the U.S. government does not pay the interest for the student while enrolled in school; they are often referred to as unsubsidized loans. The Unsubsidized Stafford Loan and Grad PLUS loans are non-need-based loans available for both undergraduate and graduate students who do not qualify for need-based financial aid.

Even though these loans are not subsidized, interest rates are set by Congress, the programs are closely supervised, and they provide many protections that private loans rarely offer.

Some non-need-based grants and scholarships consider merit rather than financial need. These awards are granted by the college or university as well as outside organizations. Merit-based scholarships are typically awarded for outstanding academic achievements and maximum SAT or ACT scores. However, some scholarships may be awarded due to special talents like athletic scholarships, leadership potential, and other personal characteristics. To be considered for such awards some institutions require an additional application process while others automatically consider all admitted students for their merit-based scholarships.

=== Non-need-based aid versus need-based aid ===
With the yearly rising cost of tuition, room and board, and fees among schools across the nation, low-income students are finding it harder to pay for their education. In an attempt to help students meet the high, costly demands of college, schools have increased merit-based grants, for students with outstanding academic positions, involvement in organizations, or high athletic talent. The issue is that these reasons for awarding scholarships take away from low-income students who often do not meet these merit standards. In other words, funds for merit-based scholarships are taking away from the already small amount of federal aid available to low-income students who simply cannot pay for college without some kind of financial aid.

In recent years, the government has responded to the financial crisis students are facing and therefore passed legislation that boosted the value of grants for low-income students and trimmed subsidies for private education lenders. Schools have also taken action for the sake of students. Harvard University, a well-known costly but wealthy institution that had previously cut tuition for students whose families earned less than $60,000 a year, proceeded to cut costs by nearly fifty percent for those students whose families earned between $120,000 and $180,000 a year. Institutions will consider students' financial needs as well as their academic merit standing when applying for financial aid. Merit-based aid and need-based aid have been linked together for many financial aid scholarships. This relationship is beneficial as it underlies that one form of financial aid, particularly merit-based, is not completely taking over need-based aid. Statistics do show results of studies performed from 1992 to 2000 that the increase in financial aid awarded was based entirely on merit. However, when viewing numbers of both merit-based and need-based aid closely, the differences are not significant.

== Graduate and professional students ==
The following types of federal financial aid are available to graduate and professional students. Aid for these students is primarily loans.

- The William D. Ford Federal Direct Loan (Direct Loan) Program: Eligible students may borrow up to $20,500 per school year. These loans are unsubsidized; Congress has determined that subsidized loans (no interest while enrolled) are only available to undergraduates. Graduate and professional students enrolled in certain health profession programs may receive additional Direct Unsubsidized Loan amounts each academic year. These federal loans, although unsubsidized, are far superior in interest rate and repayment terms to private student loans.
- Federal Perkins Loan (Perkins Loan) Program: This is a school-based loan program for eligible students with exceptional financial need. Students may qualify for a Perkins Loan of up to $8,000 each year depending on financial need, the amount of other aid received, and the availability of funds at the school. Each college has a set amount of Perkins Loans for its students; there has been controversy over the formula that is used to apportion the loans to colleges.
- Teacher Education Assistance for College and Higher Education (TEACH) Grant: The TEACH Grant Program provides grants of up to $4,000 a year to students who are completing or plan to complete coursework needed to begin a career in teaching. The TEACH Grant is different from other federal student grants in that it requires students to take certain kinds of classes to get the grant, and then to do a certain kind of job to keep the grant from turning into a loan.
- Federal Work-Study (FWS) Program: The Work-Study Program provides part-time jobs for undergraduate and graduate students with financial need. This program allows students to earn money to help pay education expenses. The program encourages community service work and work related to a student's course of study.
- Federal Pell Grant: A Pell Grant, unlike a loan, does not have to be repaid. Most graduate and professional students are not eligible for Pell Grants, but those enrolled in a post-baccalaureate teacher certification program are eligible.

Graduate students may also be eligible for these financial aid programs:

- Aid from other federal agencies (i.e., research grants or fellowships)
- State aid (i.e., state loans)
- Institutional aid (i.e., institutional scholarships or graduate assistantships/fellowships)
- Non-institutional scholarships

== International students ==
There is little financial aid available for foreign students, with the unique exception of Canadian and Mexican students. A majority of aid is awarded as grants, scholarships, and loans that come through public and private sources which restrict their awards to American citizens. That being said there is financial aid still available for international students.

Some colleges and universities offer aid to international students. To find out if the school in question offers such assistance inquire of the financial aid office of the institution. Some schools offer grants, loans, and jobs, and give anywhere from 15 to 150 awards to foreign students. For example, schools such as Harvard, Princeton, University of Pennsylvania, University of Miami, Ithaca College, Cornell University, Johns Hopkins, University of Chicago, University of Oregon, and Williams College all offer packages to foreign students. Graduate students may have more luck with financial aid. This is because graduate and teaching assistantships are offered based on academic achievement, regardless of citizenship. Although International students are not eligible for the US government aid programs like the Pell Grant, SEOG Grant, Stafford Loan, Perkins Loan, PLUS Loan, and Federal Work study, many schools will ask international students to submit a FAFSA so that they may use the data for assessing financial need.

There is also assistance a student can seek from their native country. Canadian students attending colleges in the US may obtain loans through the Canadian government's Ministry of Skills, Training, and Labour. Alternative loans Canadian international students may apply for are the Canadian Higher Education Loan Program, Global Student Loan Corporation (GLSC), and International Student Loan Program (ISLP). Financial Aid for European Students can be looked by using Noopolis, a database in Italy run by CNR (the Italian equivalent of the US's National Science Foundation). It has information regarding financial aid for Italian citizens to study abroad. There are also U.S. Educational Advising Centers throughout the world that assist prospective students by answering the questions they have about studying in the United States.

One more option for students is to seek financial support from private foundations such as Ford Foundation, and non-profit organizations such as American Association of University Women (AAUW) and Margaret McNamara Education Grants (MMEG). Each organization has its own application process and eligibility criteria detailed on respective websites.

== College cost calculators ==
Post-secondary institutions post a Cost of Attendance or Price of Attendance, also known as a "sticker price." However, that price is not how much an institution will cost an individual student. To make higher education costs more transparent before a student actually applies to college, federal law requires all post-secondary institutions receiving Title IV funds (federal funds for student aid) to post net price calculators on their websites by October 29, 2011.

As defined in The Higher Education Opportunity Act of 2008, the net price calculator's purpose is:

"…to help current and prospective students, families, and other consumers estimate the individual net price of an institution of higher education for a student. The net price calculator shall be developed in a manner that enables current and prospective students, families, and consumers to determine an estimate of a current or prospective student's net price at a particular institution."

The law defines estimated net price as the difference between an institution's average total Price of Attendance (the sum of tuition and fees, room and board, books and supplies, and other expenses including personal expenses and transportation for first-time, full-time undergraduate students who receive aid) and the institution's median need- and merit-based grant aid awarded.

Elise Miller, program director for the U.S. Department of Education's Integrated Postsecondary Education Data System (IPEDS) stated the idea behind the requirement: "We just want to break down the myth of sticker price and get beyond it. This is to give students some indication that they will not necessarily be paying that full price."

The template was developed based on the suggestions of an IPEDS' Technical Review Panel (TRP), which met on January 27–28, 2009, and included 58 individuals representing federal and state governments, post-secondary institutions from all sectors, association representatives, and template contractors. Mary Sapp, Ph.D., assistant vice president for planning and institutional research at the University of Miami, served as the panel's chair. She described the mandate's goal as "to provide prospective and current undergraduate students with some insight into the difference between an institution's sticker price and the price they will end up paying."

To meet the requirement, post-secondary institutions may choose between a basic template developed by the U.S. Department of Education or an alternative net price calculator that offers at least the minimum elements the law requires. A report issued by The Institute for College Access and Success, ""Adding it all up 2012: are net price calculators easy to find, use and compare?" found key issues with the implementation of the net price calculator requirement. In "Adding it all up," the authors state, "this report takes a more in-depth look at the net price calculators from 50 randomly selected colleges. While we found some positive practices that were not evident at the time of our previous report, net price calculators are still not reliably easy for prospective college students and their families to find, use, and compare."

After the requirement came into effect, Abigail Seldin and Whitney Haring-Smith launched the free website College Abacus, which hosted a system that would allow students to enter their personal information once, and then use and compare net prices of multiple schools. The Gates Foundation's College Knowledge Challenge announced College Abacus as one its winners in January 2013; the $100,000 grant from the Gates Foundation enabled College Abacus to expand from its beta version with 2500+ schools to a fully comprehensive version with all the colleges and universities in the United States.

== Debt vs. grants ==
=== No-loan financial aid ===
In 2001, Princeton University became the first university in the United States to eliminate loans from its financial aid packages. Since then, many other schools have followed in eliminating some or all loans from their financial aid programs. In 2022, Williams College became the first institution of higher education in the United States to eliminate both loans and work-study contributions from their financial aid programs. Many of these programs are aimed at students whose parents earn less than a certain income — the figures vary by college or university. These new initiatives were designed to attract more students and applicants from lower socioeconomic backgrounds, reduce student debt loads, and provide the offering institutions with an advantage over their rivals in attracting commitments from accepted students. Most students prefer no-loan financial aid as a way to relieve the amount of debt they are in after college

The following colleges and universities offer such no-loan financial aid packages as of March 2008:

Post-secondary institution	No-loan financial aid for families meeting these eligibility requirements:
Amherst College	No max income
Arizona State University	Arizona residents with family income of up to $60,000
Bowdoin College	No max income
Brown University	No max income
Caltech	Annual income below $60,000
Claremont McKenna College	No max income
Colby College	No max income; all students
Columbia University	No max income
Cornell University	Annual income below $75,000
Dartmouth College	Annual income below $100,000
Davidson College	No max income
Dharma Realm Buddhist University	No max income; all students
Duke University	Annual income below $40,000
Deep Springs College	No max income; all students
Emory University	Annual income below $100,000
Haverford College	No max income
Harvard University	No max income
Lafayette College	Annual income below $50,000
Lehigh University	Annual income below $50,000
MIT	Annual income below $75,000
University of Maryland, College Park	Maryland resident with 0 EFC
Michigan State University	Michigan resident with family incomes at or below the federal poverty line
Northwestern University	Family income lower than approx. $55,000
North Carolina State University	North Carolina residents with income less than 150% of the poverty line.
University of Chicago	No max income
UNC Chapel Hill	200% of federal poverty line
University of Pennsylvania	No max income
Pomona College	No max income
Princeton University	No max income
Rice University	Annual income below $80,000
Stanford University	No max income
Swarthmore College	Anyone with financial need
Tufts University	Annual income below $40,000
Vanderbilt University	No max income
Vassar College	Annual income below $60,000
University of Virginia	200% of federal poverty line ($24,000 to $37,000)
Washington and Lee University	No max income
Washington University in St. Louis	Annual Income below $60,000
Wellesley College	$60,000
Wesleyan University	$60,000
College of William and Mary	$40,000 (VA residents only)
Williams College	No max income
Yale University	No max income

=== Loan cap ===
Some universities have opted to have a "loan cap" program, which is a maximum loan — either per year or for four years combined — designed to reduce the cost of attendance for low-income and middle-class students. The following schools have a loan cap program:

School	Loan cap for students meeting these eligibility requirements:
University of Chicago	"Those whose families make between $60,000 and $75,000 will have 50% of their loans replaced."
Cornell University	Undergraduates with family incomes less than $120,000 will have loans limited to $3,000 per year.
Duke University	Undergraduate students with family income between $40,000 and $100,000 will have their loans limited on a graduated basis ($1,000 to $4,000 per year) and loans "frozen" at the freshman level.
Emory University	"Annual assessed incomes of $50,000 to $100,000 who demonstrate need for financial aid. The program caps total need-based loans at $15,000, assuming on-time progression toward graduation with up to eight semesters of study."
Grinnell College	"Beginning in the 2008-09 academic year, need-based loans for all eligible students will be capped at $2,000 per year."
University of Maryland, College Park	Students with need-based financial aid will have their loans capped at $15,900 for their four years of attendance.
Middlebury College	Family income below $40,000: $1,500 per year; family income $40,000 to $80,000: $2,500 per year; family income above $80,000: $3,500 per year.
Rice University	Students with a family income below $60,000 will not have loans. Families with incomes over $60,000 will have their loans capped at about $14,500.
University of Virginia	200% of federal poverty line ($24,000 to $37,000). Need-based loans are capped at 25% of the in-state cost of attendance, regardless of state residency.

== Effect of financial aid on enrollment, persistence, and degree attainment ==
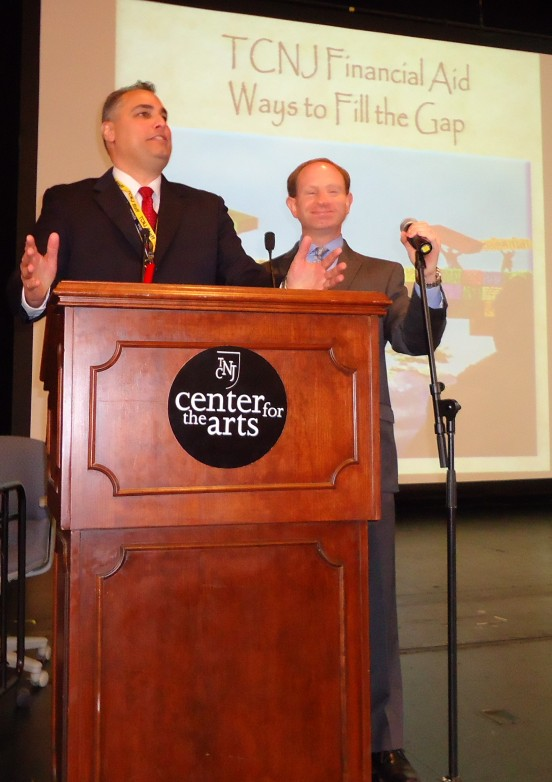
The College of New Jersey officials give a presentation on financial aid to admitted students.

Studies examining the effects of financial aid on postsecondary outcomes have generally found positive effects. For instance, a study reviewing the literature on the effects of grant aid on enrollment finds that grant aid positively increases college enrollment, with approximately a 3 to 4 percentage points increase in the likelihood of enrollment for a $1,000 reduction in costs. Similarly, a systematic review and meta-analysis by Tuan Nguyen and colleagues examining the effects of grant aid find that, across more than 40 studies, grant aid increases the probability of students persisting from year to year and of completing their degree by 2 to 3 percentage points, and an additional $1,000 of grant aid improves year-to-year persistence and degree attainment by 1.5 to 2 percentage points. This comprehensive study also finds that grant aid programs with additional non-monetary supports such as academic support and advising have larger effects, and that grant aid effects are weaker for merit-based aid than for need-based aid.

In a study on the correlation between the price of higher education and enrollment rates, Donald Heller finds that the amount of financial aid available for students is a strong factor in enrollment rates.

Different factors have different effects on financial aid:

- Decreases in the amount of financial aid lead to decreases in enrollment. However, different types of financial aid have differing effects. Grant awards tend to have a stronger effect on enrollment rates.
- Changes in tuition and financial aid affect poorer students more than they affect students with higher incomes.
- In terms of race, changes in financial aid affect black students more than it affects white students.
- Changes in financial aid affect students from community colleges more than students from four-year schools.

=== Need-blind admissions ===
Need-blind admissions do not consider a student's financial need. In a time when colleges are low on financial funds, it is difficult to maintain need-blind admissions because schools cannot meet the full needs of the poor students that they admit.

There are different levels of need-blind admissions. Few institutions are fully need-blind. Others are not need-blind for students who apply after certain deadlines, international students, and students from a waitlist. Some institutions are moving away from need-blind admissions so that they can fulfill the full needs of the students that are admitted. Meeting the full need will probably increase the funds for financial aid. For example, Wesleyan University is only need-blind if it has enough money to satisfy the full needs of admitted students.

== Affordability and critiques of the current system ==
Despite financial aid being designed to make college more accessible, research states otherwise. Many students still have significant needs that are left unmet. This occurs even after receiving everything from, grants to loans and work-study awards. Studies, like the Wisconsin Scholars Longitudinal Study, have unveiled a few points. They found that low-income students are unable to cover the full cost of attendance, including housing, food, transportation, textbooks and other living expenses. Many of these are not accounted for in standard aid packages. These absences force students to work long hours, take on private loans, reduce their course loads or leave college without completing a degree altogether.

Scholars also note financial aid communication practices obscure true affordability. For example, the former Expected Family Contribution (EFC) formula assumed families could pay way more than they could, so many students interpreted their unmet need as a personal failure, rather than a structural issue. Some institutions group grants and loans together under the label of “aid”. This helps mask the difference between gift aid and debt.

Many critiques have focused on shifts in long-term policy, and since the early 2000s, state investment in public higher education has heavily declined. This has been seen across most of the United States. As public funding has decreased, tuition costs and student fees have increased to replace it. Analysts argue this shift redefines higher education from being viewed as a public good to being viewed as a private investment. Something that individuals are forced to finance through their own personal debt.

=== The financial realities of students ===
Student experiences now play a major role in this conversation about affordability too. Interviews of students and case studies has shown the true depth of this issue. Many students experience food insecurity and unstable housing without financial aid. Even while receiving financial aid, many students continue to struggle. These challenges have led certain students to turn to crowdfunding sites, such as gofundme.

The debate about college affordability continues in public policy and higher education. Proposals, like tuition-free public college and large-scale loan forgiveness, are getting more attention. Although, critics argue they are too costly or unfair. Supporters argue expanding public investment would restore the historic role of higher education. Something that once existed as a pathway to economic opportunity. Something that led to reducing social burdens and financial burdens in the long-term for low-income students.

== See also ==
- College admissions in the United States
- Scholarship
- Student financial aid (list of articles on student financial aid in other countries)
- Transfer admissions in the United States
