= Federal Supplemental Educational Opportunity Grant =

US federal aid for college

The Federal Supplemental Educational Opportunity Grant, more commonly known by its acronym SEOG, is a federal assistance grant reserved for college students with the greatest need for financial aid to attend school. To be eligible for this grant, applicants must meet all of the following criteria:

1. To be a United States citizen or eligible non-citizen,
2. To not have a bachelor's degree,
3. To not be in default of any federal student loan,
4. To not have a Federal Pell Grant overpayment,
5. To file their FAFSA.

The maximum FSEOG is $4,000 a year and the amount applicants are eligible for is at the discretion of the college. To obtain the FSEOG, the student must accomplish and submit the Free Application for Federal Student Aid (FAFSA).
