= Irving A. Fradkin =

American optometrist

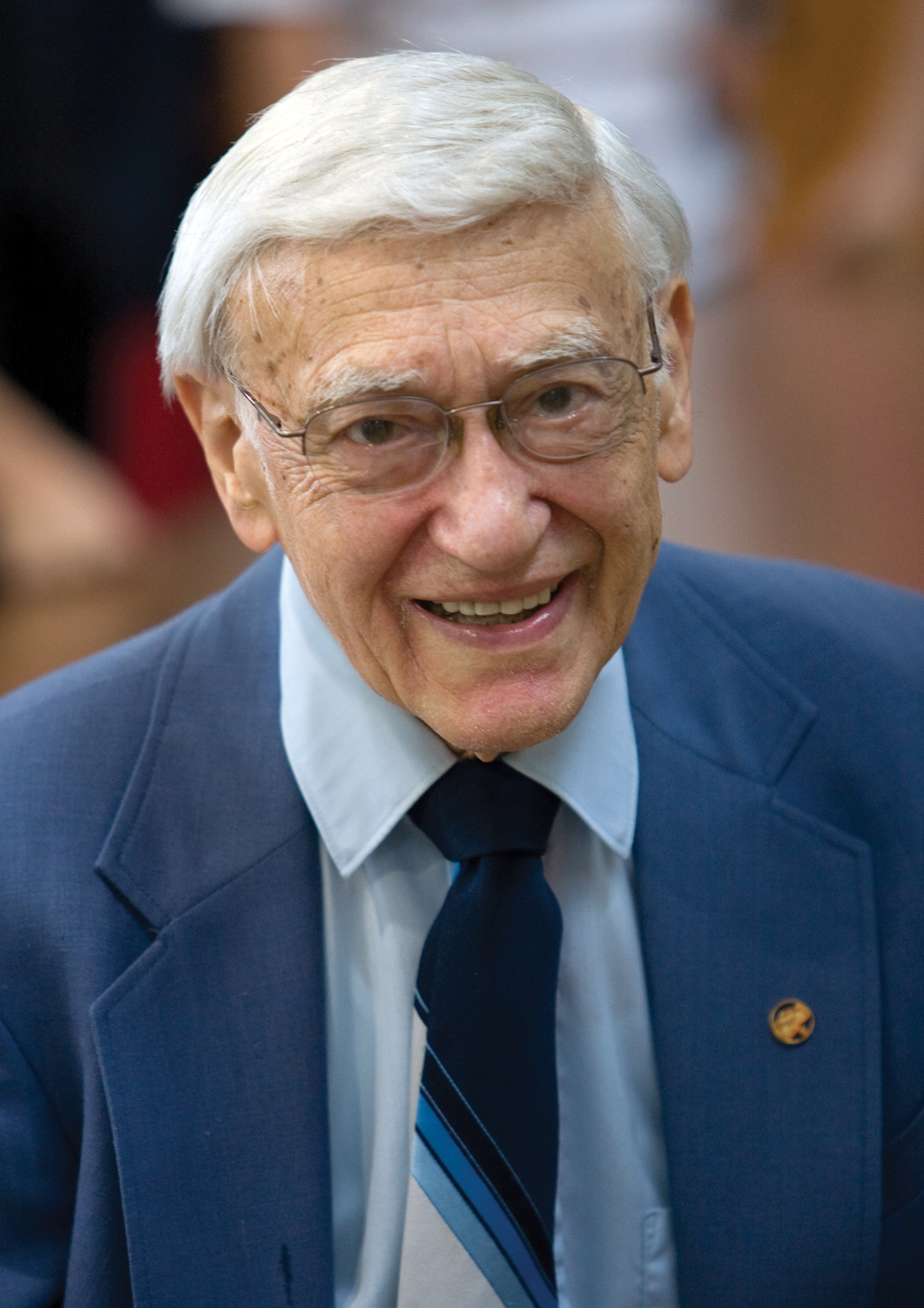
- Headshot of Irving A. Fradkin
- Born: March 28, 1921; Chelsea, Massachusetts, U.S.
- Died: November 19, 2016 (aged 95); Fall River, Massachusetts, U.S.
- Education: New England College of Optometry
- Occupation: Optometrist
- Title: Founder and President Emeritus, Scholarship America
- Spouse: Charlotte Fradkin (m. 1946)

Irving A. Fradkin (March 28, 1921 – November 19, 2016) was an optometrist and founder and president emeritus of Scholarship America.

Fradkin has been referred to as the "Johnny Appleseed" of college scholarships due to his leadership in scholarship access; his work has received national media coverage and government support. Since its founding, Scholarship America has distributed more than $3.7 billion in scholarships and educational assistance to 2.3 million students, which the organization cites as being the largest nonprofit, private-sector scholarship support and educational support organization in the United States.

== Early life ==
Fradkin was born in Chelsea, Massachusetts, and was the seventh and youngest child of Jewish Russian immigrants. He graduated from the Massachusetts College of Optometry in Boston (now the New England College of Optometry). In 1943, with $700 borrowed from his father, Fradkin opened his first optometry office in Fall River, Massachusetts. He married his wife, Charlotte, in 1946.

== Scholarship America ==
Fradkin ran for the Fall River school committee in 1957 on a platform calling for community-supported scholarships for local students. After not being elected to the committee, Fradkin pursued his idea and founded the initial chapter of what he later called "Dollars for Scholars" in 1958, by challenging everyone in his community to give at least one dollar toward sending its youth to college. He cited helping children to get an education as his way of giving back to the country that gave to him.

On May 15, 1961, Scholarship America was officially chartered under the name "Citizens' Scholarship Foundation of America." At the time of the charter, the foundation was operating Dollars for Scholars chapters in eleven New England cities. National press attention from publications such as Time, Reader's Digest and Saturday Review provided credibility and awareness for the organization. As of 2016, since its founding, the organization had distributed $3.5 billion to 2.2 million students across the U.S.

At age 92, Fradkin retired from active participation in scholarship activities, although he continued to advocate for higher education and Scholarship America. He died on November 19, 2016, at his home in Fall River.

== Awards ==
Fradkin has been honored locally and nationally for his grassroots success with Scholarship America. Select awards include:

- 1998 National Association of Student Financial Aid Administrators’ (NASFAA) Allan W. Purdy Distinguished Service Award
- Isaiah Avila Award for “Uncommon Common Man”
- Schow-Donnelly Service Before Self Award
- Recognition from the President's Task Force for Private Sector Initiatives
- 2010 National College Access Network (NCAN) “Champion for College Access” Award
- Finalist for the Congressional Medal of Honor Foundation’s “Citizen Service Before Self” award
- Honorary doctorate from Fradkin's alma mater, New England College of Optometry
- Honorary doctorate from Stonehill College

== Media ==
In September 2012, CNNMoney cited Fradkin as a pioneer in making higher education affordable as part of its Money Heroes series.

In October 2013, Katie Couric featured Fradkin on her nationwide daytime talk show, Katie, in recognition of his life's work with Scholarship America. Couric's first book, The Best Advice I Ever Got: Lessons from Extraordinary Lives, also included a foreword from Fradkin. Proceeds from the sale of her book were donated to Scholarship America.

Fradkin reappeared on Katie in May 2014, along with Scholarship America President & CEO Lauren Segal, as part of the organization's inaugural Dream Award recipient announcement.

== Works ==
- The Autobiography of Dr. Irving A. Fradkin, Founder; Citizens' Scholarship Foundation of America, Inc. with Michael J. Vieira (2002, Branden Books; ISBN 0-8283-2080-2)
