= College Board =

US educational nonprofit testing organization

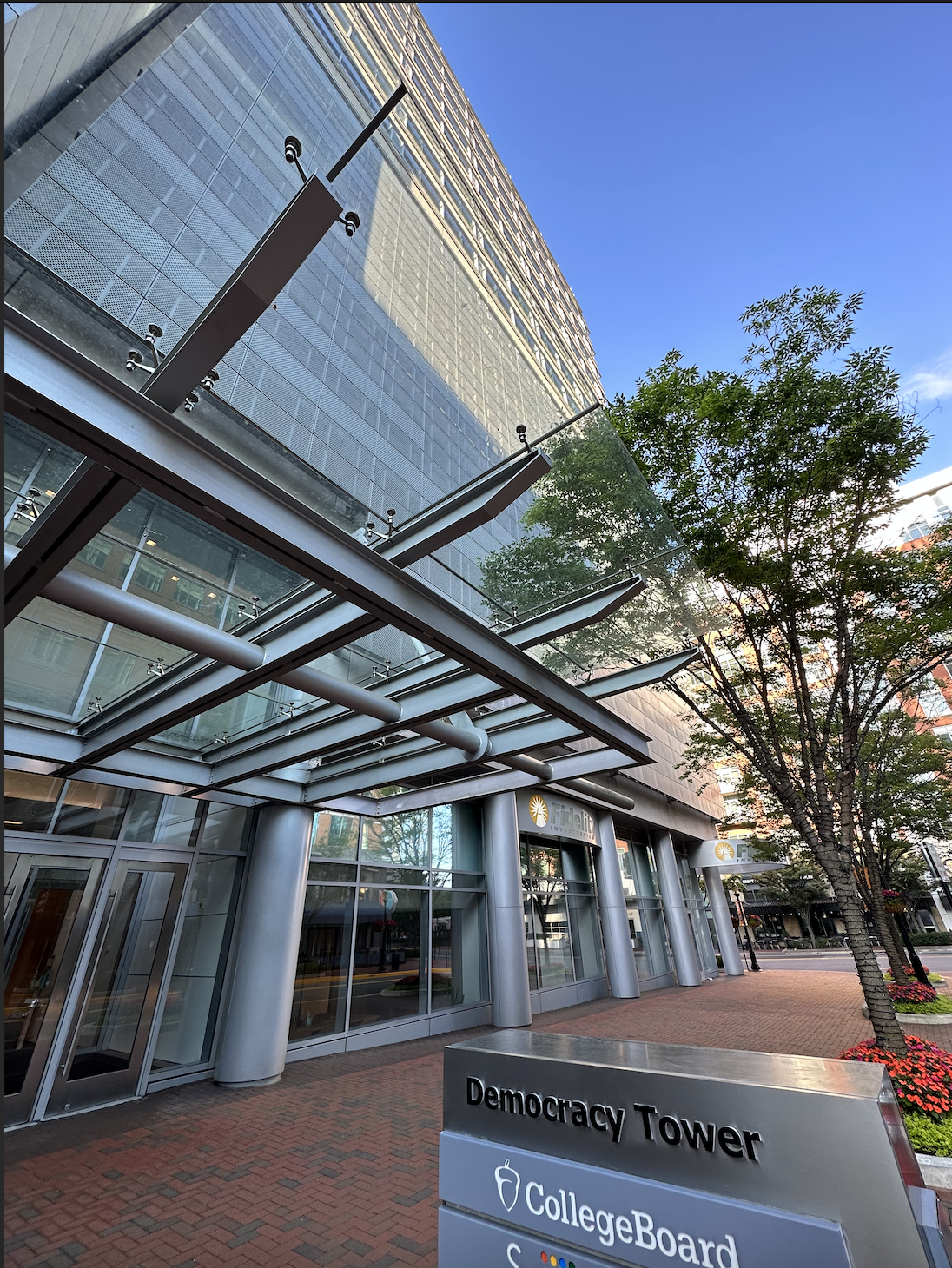
- One of College Board's office buildings in Reston, VA
- Founded: December 22, 1899; 126 years ago (as College Entrance Examination Board)
- Type: Nonprofit educational
- Location: 250 Vesey Street, New York City, U.S. (headquarters)
- CEO: David Coleman
- President: Jeremy Singer
- Revenue: ▲US$1.11 billion (2019)
- Expenses: ▲US$1.05 billion (2019)
- Website: collegeboard.org
- Formerly called: College Entrance Examination Board

The College Board, styled as CollegeBoard, is an American not-for-profit organization. It was formed in December 1899 as the College Entrance Examination Board (CEEB) to expand access to higher education. While the College Board is not an association of colleges, it runs a membership association of institutions, including over 6,000 schools, colleges, universities, and other educational organizations.

The College Board develops and administers standardized tests and curricula used by K–12 and post-secondary education institutions to promote college-readiness and as part of the college admissions process. The College Board is headquartered in New York City. David Coleman has been the CEO since October 2012. He replaced Gaston Caperton, former governor of West Virginia, who had held this position since 1999. The current president of the College Board is Jeremy Singer.

In addition to managing assessments for which it charges fees, the College Board provides resources, tools, and services to students, parents, colleges, and universities in college planning, recruitment and admissions, financial aid, and retention.

== History ==
The College Entrance Examination Board (CEEB) was founded at Columbia University in the City of New York on December 22, 1899, by representatives of 12 universities and three high school preparatory academies in the states of New York and New Jersey. These were:

- Columbia University
- Colgate University
- University of Pennsylvania
- New York University
- Barnard College
- Union College
- Rutgers University
- Vassar College
- Bryn Mawr College
- Women's College of Baltimore (now Goucher College)
- Princeton University
- Cornell University
- Newark Academy
- Mixed High School, New York
- Collegiate Institute, New York

The organization's intent was to "adopt and publish a statement of the ground which should be covered and of the aims which should be sought by secondary school teaching in each of the following subjects (and in such others as may be desirable), and a plan of examination suitable as a test for admission to college: Botany, Chemistry, English, French, German, Greek, History, Latin, Mathematics, Physics, Zoology".

== CEEB code ==
The College Board maintains a numbered registry of countries, college majors, colleges, scholarship programs, test centers, and high schools. In the United States, this registry is borrowed by other institutions as a means of unambiguous identification; thus, a student might give their guidance department a college's name and address and its CEEB code to ensure that their transcript is sent correctly. There exists a similar set of ACT codes for colleges and scholarships, centers, and high schools; however, these codes are less widely used outside ACT, Inc.

== Tests and programs ==
=== SAT and SAT Subject Tests ===
The SAT is a fee-based digital standardized test for college admissions in the United States, first administered in 1926. The College Board decides how the SAT is constructed, administered, and used in the United States. Educational Testing Service (ETS) develops, administers, publishes, and scores the SAT. The SAT covers writing, reading, and mathematics. SAT scores range from 400 to 1600, with each of the two sections—Reading and Writing and Math—both worth up to 800 points. The digital SAT is an adaptive test, made up of two reading and writing modules and two math modules. If the test taker does well on the first module of a section, then the second module of the section will be harder, and if the test taker does poorly on the first module, the second module will be easier. Most students take the test during their junior or senior year of high school. The SAT competes with the ACT, another standardized college admissions test.

Currently, the base test is $68. Various fees can accumulate—registering beyond the registration deadline results in a $30 late fee and changing a test date, center, or test type results in a $25 fee. The waitlist testing fee is $53; the first four score reports are free, and each additional score report is $14. Students sitting for the test in regions outside the United States pay an additional 'Non-U.S. Regional Fee' between $43 and $53. As a result, student testing fees may run up to $200 or more for a single test. However, fee waivers and reductions are available for some low-income students.

On March 5, 2014, the College Board announced that a redesigned version of the SAT would be administered for the first time in 2016. The exam reverted to the 1600-point scale, and the essay became optional (previously, the test had been scored out of 2400 points). The testing process was changed to give students three hours to take the exam plus 50 additional minutes to complete the essay. In the same announcement, the College Board also said they would be partnering with Khan Academy to make available, from spring 2015, free test preparation materials for the redesigned SAT. This included a preparation application to help students practice and identify areas of improvement. Practice problems and videos demonstrating step-by-step solutions were also made available.

The SAT Subject Tests were standardized tests intended to measure student performance in specific areas, such as mathematics, science, and history. On January 19, 2021, the College Board discontinued Subject Tests. This was effective immediately in the United States. The following summer, the tests were to be phased out for international students. CollegeBoard has discontinued the optional essay section of the SAT after June 2021.

On May 13, 2015, the College Board announced the release of a new credential initiative to get students more interested in careers focused in STEM with a Project Lead the Way partnership.

In March 2020, College Board announced the cancellation of several test dates during the spring of 2020 due to the COVID-19 pandemic, and as a result many colleges temporarily or permanently changed to a test-optional or test-blind admissions policy (that is, they either did not require the submission of SAT scores, or they refused to accept SAT scores).

On January 25, 2022, College Board announced that the SAT would be delivered digitally, in an attempt to change the format of the test itself. Vice President of the College Readiness Assessment at College Board, Priscilla Rodriguez, said, "The digital SAT will be easier to take, easier to give and more relevant". Some new features of this digital version of the SAT include a two-hour testing period instead of the three-hour period that had been used for the current SAT, more relevant topics that cover material given in college courses, and calculators allowed for the entirety of the Math portion of the exam. A digital version of the exam allows College Board to address inequities associated with student accessibility to technology. This change was brought forth by College Board following disruptions in testing that were COVID-related. The 2021 SAT Suite of Assessment Program results showed that 1.5 million high school students took the test, compared to 2.2 million students in 2020.

As of spring of 2024, all SATs have been transitioned to be taken on the Bluebook exam application.

=== PSAT/NMSQT ===
The PSAT/NMSQT is a fee-based standardized test that provides firsthand practice for the SAT for a cost of $18. However, the cost may vary based on state, district, or school. The test also functions as a qualifying test for the National Merit Scholarship Corporation's scholarship programs. There are also other forms of the PSAT, including the PSAT 10 and the PSAT 8/9. However, the PSAT 10 and the PSAT 8/9 do not qualify a student for the National Merit Scholarship.

As of spring of 2024, all PSATs have been transitioned to be taken on the Bluebook exam application.

=== Advanced Placement Program ===
The College Board's Advanced Placement Program (AP) is an extensive program that offers high school students the chance to participate in what the College Board describes as college-level classes, reportedly broadening students' intellectual horizons and preparing them for college work. It also plays a large part in the college admissions process, showing students' intellectual capacity and genuine interest in learning. The program allows many students to gain college credit for high performance on the AP exams, which cost $97 each, much in the same manner as the CLEP. Granting credit, however, is at the discretion of the college. 290 colleges grant credit or advanced standing.

In 2020, due to COVID-19 pandemic restrictions, College Board began offering some exams digitally. In May 2020, glitches prevented some students from submitting their AP exams, forcing those students to re-take them in June. As of 2025, 28 of 36 course exams were digital-only.

=== College Level Examination Program ===
The College Level Examination Program (CLEP) provides students of any age with the opportunity to demonstrate college-level achievement through a program of exams in undergraduate college courses. Two thousand nine hundred colleges grant credit for passing CLEP exams.

=== Accuplacer ===
The Accuplacer test is a computer-based placement test that assesses reading, writing, and math skills. The Accuplacer test includes reading comprehension, sentence skills, arithmetic, elementary algebra, college-level mathematics, and the writing test, Writeplacer. The Accuplacer test is used primarily by more than 1,000 high schools and colleges to determine a student's needed placement. Often community colleges have specific guidelines for students requiring the Accuplacer test. The Accuplacer Companion paper-and-pencil tests allow students with disabilities (specifically students with an Individualized Education Program or 504 Plan) to take the test through its braille, large print, and audio tests. The biggest benefit of the Accuplacer and Accuplacer Companion tests is their ability to be scored immediately through an online scoring system and taken in remote locations. While there are normally no fees for taking the test, some institutions may charge a fee to retake the test. If a testing institution is not local, an examinee may be required to arrange a proctor for the test. If so, a local library may be willing to serve as a proctor as there are not many other options for individuals in this case. Most schools will only test their own admissions candidates.

=== SpringBoard ===
SpringBoard is a pre-Advanced Placement program created by the College Board to prepare students who intend to take AP courses or college-level courses in their scholastic careers. Based on Wiggins and McTighe's "Understanding by Design" model, the SpringBoard program attempts to map knowledge into scholastic skill sets in preparation for Advanced Placement testing and college success. Units of instruction are titrated to students within and across all school grades, providing a vertically articulated curriculum framework that scaffolds learning skills and subject test knowledge. Implicit in the course curriculum, the program embeds pre-AP and AP teaching and learning strategies across grade school levels and classwork.

The curriculum applies to grades 6 through 12. Teachers are provided with formative assessments, professional training, and various teaching tools to track student progress. The instructional framework is integrated into the curriculum content and subject materials. SpringBoard also provides other Web 2.0 resources aimed at making the program more community-oriented.

=== Triunfadores ===
On June 23, 2020, the College Board and NBCUniversal Telemundo Enterprises launched a joint public campaign Triunfadores to help guide primarily Spanish-speaking families through their child's college planning process. This campaign will offer funding to scholarships that are included in the College Board Opportunity Scholarship program that encourages students to apply for a chance to earn $40,000 towards their college tuition. These scholarships are open to any student, regardless of their citizenship status and are strictly reserved for students whose household income is less than $60,000.

=== BigFuture ===
BigFuture is a free online resource that helps students plan for college, pay for college, and explore careers. BigFuture's National Recognition Program awards honors to underrepresented students, including African American students, Hispanic students, Indigenous students, and students who live in rural areas or small towns.

=== Bluebook ===
Bluebook is a secure testing application for Windows, MacOS, iPadOS, and ChromeOS. Bluebook is used to take digital College Board exams, such as the SAT, PSAT, and certain AP exams. All SAT and PSATs transitioned to digital only in spring 2024. Some AP exams are fully digital, while others are paper only or a hybrid of the two. College Board is working to transition the remaining AP paper exams to digital exams.

== CSS Profile ==
The College Board also offers the CSS/Financial Aid PROFILE, a financial aid application service that many institutions use in determining family contribution and financial assistance packages. Students also must pay a $25 fee to apply and another $16 for each additional school to which they submit the profile.

== Criticism and controversies ==
Criticism of the Board and its exams goes back to at least 1922, with a Harvard Alumni Bulletin article from prep school teacher Morgan Barnes. Barnes took ten different examinations "in cognito qua candidate", requested the graded booklets of his exams, and attempted to confront some readers who scored them. Among Barnes's grievances were general incompetence in grading, excessive focus on exam preparation in classrooms, and overreliance on exam scores in the college admissions process.

Since the late 1970s, the College Board has been subject to criticism from students, educators, and consumer rights activists. The College Board owns the SAT, and many students must take SAT exams for admission to competitive colleges. Some colleges also require students to submit a College Board CSS/Financial Aid PROFILE when applying for financial aid. As there are no broadly accepted alternatives to College Board products such as AP, SAT Subject Tests, and CSS/Financial Aid, the company is often criticized as exploiting its monopoly on these products.

FairTest, an organization that advocates against over-dependence on standardized tests in school admissions, maintains that the SAT often underestimates the aptitude of African-American students and others. FairTest maintains a list of more than 1000 SAT-optional colleges on its website.

The consumer rights organization Americans for Educational Testing Reform (AETR) has criticized the College Board for violating its non-profit status through excessive profits and exorbitant executive compensation; nineteen of its executives make more than $300,000 per year, with CEO Gaston Caperton earning $1.3 million in 2009 (including deferred compensation). AETR also claims that College Board is acting unethically by selling test preparation materials, directly lobbying legislators and government officials, and refusing to acknowledge test-taker rights.

=== Nonprofit status ===
The College Board's designation as a 501(c)(3) tax-exempt nonprofit has drawn sustained criticism from consumer advocates, journalists, and education policy commentators, who argue that its financial practices are more consistent with those of a for-profit corporation than with those of charitable organizations that operate under the same designation, such as the American Red Cross.

The College Board reported revenue exceeding $1.2 billion in 2019, and has recorded a budget surplus in nearly every year for which financial data is publicly available, except 2014. Critics have questioned how an organization that consistently generates such surpluses—derived primarily from fees charged to students who have few practical alternatives to its products—qualifies for tax-exempt nonprofit status.

Executive compensation has drawn particular scrutiny. In 2019, CEO David Coleman earned $1.67 million, and nine other senior staff each received more than $500,000. The organization has been reported to spend over $8 million annually on executive compensation in total, an amount critics contend exceeds what is legally "reasonable" for a nonprofit under Internal Revenue Service guidelines. This pattern has persisted over time: in 2017, Coleman earned $1.3 million while the College Board posted a $140 million surplus, and his predecessor, Gaston Caperton, earned $1.3 million in 2009—more than the chief executives of the American Red Cross or Harvard University at the time.

Critics have further argued that the College Board has failed to deploy its financial resources in ways that serve its stated public mission. Despite nearly doubling the number of AP exams administered between 2008 and 2022, the organization has not produced evidence of corresponding gains in undergraduate enrollment or college success among underrepresented students. Concerns about the affordability of the College Board's testing products for students from low-income households are discussed further in the Exam fees section below. The consumer rights organization Americans for Educational Testing Reform (AETR) has accused the College Board of violating its nonprofit status through excessive profits, exorbitant executive compensation, the sale of test-preparation materials, and direct lobbying of government officials.

=== Exam fees ===
The SAT Reasoning registration fee was $68 as of June 2025 with an additional $34 fee for late registrations; as of March 2025, AP exams cost $99 with an additional $40 fee for late orders. The SAT Subject Tests cost a baseline of $26 with a $22 fee for each test. Other services can be added to the basic costs, including late registration, score verification services, and various answering available services. SAT score reports cost $12 per college for 1–2-week electronic delivery or 2–4-week paper or disk delivery. The College Board allows high school administrators to authorize fee waivers for some services to students from low-income families, generally those meeting National School Lunch Act criteria. In addition, because of the competitive nature of the test, many students take preparatory courses or have SAT tutoring, which can increase costs. The College Board's College Scholarship Service Profile (CSS), a college financial aid application meant to help students pay for college, also requires a fee.

In 2017, the College Board had a $140 million surplus. Budget surpluses persist despite market-leading compensation packages for the College Board's executives – in 2009, the College Board paid out a $1.3 million/year package for CEO Caperton, more than the head of the American Red Cross or Harvard University. It paid 19 executives more than $300,000 each per year.

=== Correlation between essay length and score ===
In 2005, MIT Writing Director Les Perelman plotted essay length versus essay score on the new SAT from released essays and found a high correlation between them. After studying 23 graded essays, he found that the longer the essay was, the higher its score. Perelman found that he could accurately determine the score of an essay without even reading the essay. In his study, he discovered that several of these essays were full of factual inaccuracies. The College Board does not claim to grade for factual accuracy.

Perelman, along with the National Council of Teachers of English, also criticized the 25-minute writing section of the test for damaging standards of writing taught in the classroom. They say that writing teachers training their students for the SAT will not instill revision, depth, and accuracy but will instead guide them to produce long, formulaic, and wordy pieces. "You're getting teachers to train students to be bad writers", concluded Perelman.

=== Advanced Placement classes ===
Some teachers have criticized AP classes as restrictive in the nature of their curriculum and yet indispensable due to the importance of AP classes in the college admissions process. The College Board can effectively control every aspect of AP classes directly or indirectly. The $97 fee, which is noted critically above, results only in a score report with the test name and grade. No details are given on how this scoring was reached nor are individuals given access to this information from College Board.

Additionally, starting with a pilot program in 2018 and officially rolling out to all schools in 2019, the College Board required students to sign up for AP tests during the fall before early-round college decisions are out. While the College Board stated that this was to ensure students commit to learning the material at the beginning of the year, the move drew criticism from students, stating that because they do not know whether or not the college they end up attending will grant credit for the test, the new, early registration deadline forces students to pay for tests that they will receive no benefit from. The College Board also charges $40 if a student does not sit for a test that they signed up for, meaning that many students who signed up for tests that would not grant them any credit still have to sit for those tests or pay the $40 fee.

Traditionally, AP exams are given in a school setting and last two to four hours. However, in 2020, due to the COVID-19 pandemic, the College Board created an alternate form of AP testing for that year. Students were to take exams at home in a shortened 45-minute, open-book format. During the exams, there were reports of disruptions in the process, such as students being unable to submit their answers, general confusion about the test process, and more.

=== Reporting errors ===
In March 2006, it was discovered that the College Board had incorrectly scored several thousand tests taken in October 2005. Although the Board was aware of the error as early as December, it waited months to respond, and in late March, schools still did not have the correct details. Within days of the first announcement, the Board corrected the number of affected students upward.

Many colleges use the SAT score to decide acceptance and scholarships. The late reporting of errors upset many high-profile colleges. The dean of admissions at Pomona College commented, "Everybody appears to be telling half-truths, and that erodes confidence in the College Board...It looks like they hired the people who used to do the books for Enron".

=== Sale of student data ===
As of September 2021, the College Board charges $0.50 per name for access to student information. An investigation by the New York Civil Liberties Union revealed that one of the College Board's customers was JAMRS, a military recruitment program run by the United States Department of Defense. The College Board and ACT have been sued over the use of this information. In addition, there is criticism that students are not sufficiently made aware that their data is being sold, or that disclosure of certain data is optional. The College Board has received substantial backlash for these practices.

=== Recycling SAT exams ===
On August 25, 2018, the SAT given in America was a recycled October 2017 international SAT given in China. The leaked PDF file was on the internet before the August 25, 2018 exam.

=== Relationship with Hanban ===
In 2004, Hanban and the College Board developed the "AP Chinese Language and Culture Course and Exam" program.

In October 2020, the College Board announced its intention to terminate financial ties with Hanban, in place since 2006, following a letter from U.S. senators critical of the relationship due to its affiliation with the Chinese government.

== See also ==
- ACT, a test by ACT, Inc., the main competitor to the College Board's SAT
- College admissions in the United States
- IB Diploma Programme, a pre-university educational program administered by the International Baccalaureate, the main competitor to the College Board's Advanced Placement (AP) Program
- Writing assessment
