= CSS Profile =

Application for non-federal financial aid at some US colleges

The CSS Profile, short for the College Scholarship Service Profile, is an online application created and maintained by the United States–based College Board that allows incoming and current college students to apply for non-federal financial aid. It is primarily designed to give member institutions of the College Board a comprehensive look at the financial and family situation of students and their families to use as they determine their eligibility for institutional financial aid.

The CSS Profile is used to determine student financial aid by approximately 400 colleges, universities, and scholarship programs in the United States.
