= College Year in Athens =

American non-profit organization

- Founded: 1962
- Type: Non-Profit Education Foundation
- Purpose: Study Abroad program focusing on Greek and Mediterranean studies
- Location: Athens, Greece
- Website: www.cyathens.org

College Year in Athens (CYA) is a not-for-profit, 501(c)(3) educational institution founded in 1963 and incorporated in the State of Delaware. It is based in Cambridge, Massachusetts, and governed by a board of trustees. It offers its study abroad program through the Athens-based International Center for Hellenic and Mediterranean Studies (DIKEMES). CYA is the first study abroad program in Greece for English speaking students and is a member of NAFSA: Association of International Educators, EAIE: European Association for International Education, and a charter member of FORUM: Forum on Education Abroad.

== History ==
CYA was founded in 1962 by Ismene Phylactopoulou (1907-1983), a graduate of Wellesley College who received the Doctorate of Humane Letters from DePauw University in recognition of her achievements in study abroad.

== Campus ==
The program's academic facilities are located at 5 Plateia Panathinaikou Stadiou, next to the Athens Marble Stadium (panathenaic Stadium), in the Pangrati area of Athens, near the Athens National Gardens and Lycabettus Hill.

== Curriculum ==
The CYA study abroad program focuses upon the history and civilization of Greece and the Mediterranean region. The program of studies originally focused on Archaic and Classical Greece; over time, the historical range was expanded to include courses from prehistoric to modern times. In 1986 courses were added on the history, politics, and international affairs of the Balkans, western Asia, and the Middle East in recent times. Later in 1993, courses in European and East Mediterranean Studies were added. All classes are taught in English, while Modern Greek language courses are offered as part of the curriculum. Many courses are taught on-site at archaeological sites and museums. Study-travel is an integral part of the CYA curriculum and trips are conducted by faculty and staff. Students visit major sites relevant to ancient, Byzantine, or modern Greek history during trips to Crete, the Peloponnese, and Central and Northern Greece. The program is organized using American standards for teaching and grading. CYA offers its own year- or semester-long program, as well as shorter summer programs. It also creates and hosts customized programs for other US educational institutions.

== Library resources ==
The CYA Library has a collection of approximately 5.500 books, CDs and DVDs in the fields of philosophy, history, art and archaeology, ethnography, literature, languages, religion and politics, natural sciences, and maintains various subscriptions to print journals and newspapers, a subscription to the Blegen Library of the American School of Classical Studies at Athens, as well as part of JSTOR's database of electronic journals and to Columbia International Affairs Online.

It is the first library in Greece to use the open source Integrated Library System KOHA for cataloguing, catalog searches, circulation, and patron management, and also makes use of the Course Management System Moodle, which facilitates instructor communication with students regarding course assignments, on-site meeting times and places, and important updates.

== Housing ==
CYA students live in self-contained apartments in residential apartment buildings in the Pangrati area of Athens, which are situated a 2-10-minute walk from the CYA Academic Center.

== Notable faculty ==
- Frederick Ahl
- Peter Green
- H.D.F. Kitto
- Kimon Friar
- Philip Sherrard
- Stewart Perowne
- Akiko Busch

== Notable alumni ==
- David L. Carden (US Ambassador)
- Barbara Kingsolver (Writer)
- Eleni Tsakopoulos Kounalakis (US Ambassador)
- Steven Rales (Chairman, Danaher Corporation)
- Deborah L. Wince-Smith (President, U.S. Council on Competitiveness)
