= Forum on Education Abroad =

The Forum on Education Abroad
- Founded: 2001
- Type: Education Abroad
- Location: Carlisle, Pennsylvania
- Region served: Worldwide
- Members: 800+ Institutional Members
- Key people: Melissa Torres (President & CEO)
- Website: forumea.org

The Forum on Education Abroad is a 501(c)(3) non-profit association recognized by the Department of Justice and the Federal Trade Commission as the Standards Development Organization for the field of education abroad. It is located on the campus of Dickinson College in Carlisle, Pennsylvania. Founded in 2001, the Forum now boasts over 800 institutional members that collectively represent 90% of U.S. students that study abroad. Members are primarily U.S. colleges and universities, program provider organizations, overseas host institutions and programs and affiliates that provide services to the field.

Stated goals include establishing Standards of Good Practice, conducting research to assess outcomes of education abroad and collect useful data, promoting excellence in curriculum design and advocating for education abroad at all levels. The Forum President & CEO is Melissa Torres.

== History ==
The Forum was first conceived in San Diego in May 2000 by a group of education abroad professionals who felt the field would require a stand-alone organization. By January 2001, an organizational statement and goals for the new organization were defined. A subsequent meeting a month later in Tucson resulted in the creation of a mission statement with five goal areas, the development of criteria for voting membership, and the establishment of subcommittees to produce a Communications Plan, Business Plan, Incorporation Plan, and Member Services/Tasks Plan. In July 2001, the decision was made to incorporate as the Forum on Education Abroad, and over the course of the next year, a Board of Advisors was created and the search for an executive director was launched. The Forum co-sponsored the University of Minnesota's Curriculum Integration Conference and agreed to partner with Frontiers: The Interdisciplinary Journal of Study Abroad, and adopt it as the official journal of the Forum.

The first annual meeting of the Forum was held in May 2002 with over 150 members in attendance, who approved an Advisory Council (now called the Forum Council). In November 2004, the Forum held its first annual conference in conjunction with the Council on International Educational Exchange annual conference, in Santa Fe, New Mexico with 165 participants in attendance. In 2005 the Forum received recognition from the U.S. Department of Justice and the Federal Trade Commission to serve as the Standards Development Organization (SDO) for the field of education abroad.

The Forum's Bylaws were revised on May 25, 2006, and on July 1, 2006, the Forum moved its operations to Dickinson College in Pennsylvania. Brian Whalen, who had been serving as chair of the Forum Council, became president and CEO while continuing his duties as associate provost and executive director of global education at Dickinson College. The Forum's third annual conference, "Standards in a Diverse World: The Future of Education Abroad" was convened in Austin, Texas in March 2007. This was the Forum's first stand-alone conference, and it attracted 400 attendees. Presentations and sessions focused on the results of the Forum's Standards Pilot Project.

The Forum Board of Directors formally adopted the Standards of Good Practice for Education Abroad (2007) on July 14, 2007. Also in 2007, the Quality Improvement Program (QUIP) was launched as a voluntary process for Forum member institutions to be recognized for assessing how well their programs meet the Standards of Good Practice.

In 2013 the Forum membership has grown to include more than 650 member institutions composed of 75% U.S. colleges and universities; 15% provider organizations; and 10% universities located outside of the United States. Together Forum members represent over 90% of the U.S. students who study abroad.

=== Role in Cuomo Investigation ===
Study abroad received an unprecedented amount of legal and media attention after an August 2007 article published in The New York Times highlighted the often opaque nature of providers of study abroad form relationships with U.S. universities. The article prompted the office of New York Attorney General Andrew M. Cuomo to launch an investigation, issuing subpoenas to a dozen study abroad study abroad organizations and at least 15 colleges and universities. The Code of Ethics that the forum developed as a response sought to offer colleges, overseas-study providers, and foreign host institutions a "compass" to guide their management of study abroad.

== The Standards ==
As the only organization recognized as the SDO for education abroad, the Forum as an organization is responsible for determining Standards of Good Practice for the field and providing resources, services and programs to educate members, as well as the public at large.

=== History ===
The Standards were created as a reaction to what was largely an unsupervised and unregulated field involving a variety of players with differing motives, backgrounds and approaches. Additionally, here was also a push to address growing risk and liability concerns given the fact that while education abroad enrollment numbers continued to climb throughout the 1990s and 2000s, many U.S. colleges and universities were struggling with limited resources.

Prior to the Standards' development, existing quality control mechanisms in education abroad were few and those in place were mainly used on an ad hoc basis. Existing mechanisms included regional and disciplinary accreditation, in-country accreditation and reviews APUNE, institutional guidelines and practices, internal or outside reviewers, student evaluations, faculty and department reviews, advisory boards, approved program lists as some institutions.

The first edition of the Standards were released in 2004, and the second edition was put out the next year. In January 2006, the Forum began testing the Standards, based on the 2005 second edition, in a Pilot Project with a group of volunteer institutional participants – domestic and overseas providers, domestic and overseas universities and colleges, community colleges and consortia. The results of this landmark Project were presented and discussed at the Forum annual Conference in Austin, Texas, Texas, March 1–3, 2007. Feedback collected during the Pilot Project resulted in a third edition, released in March 2008. In response to the increasing number of short-term education abroad programs and the Forum's membership call for guidance, the Standards Committee drafted Standards of Good Practice for Short Term Education Abroad Programs that was released in 2009.

=== Quality Improvement Program (QUIP) for Education Abroad ===
Institutional members are eligible to participate in the Forum's Quality Improvement Program (QUIP) as part of its strategic goal of developing and implementing standards designed to improve quality. QUIP consists of a guided self-study and peer review process, resulting in a comprehensive report and recommendations in the areas of program design, evaluation and assessment, marketing and promotion, student advising, and resources and operations. IES Abroad was the first third party provider to successfully complete this category of review and receive the QUIP 2A designation.

== See also ==
- Study abroad in the United States
- NAFSA: Association of International Educators
- Study abroad organization
