= Untold Night and Day =

2018 memoir by Baek Se-hee

- Author: Bae Suah
- Original title: 알려지지 않은 밤과 하루
- Translator: Deborah Smith
- Language: Korean
- Genre: Fiction
- Set in: Seoul, South Korea
- Publisher: Jaeum & Moeum, Jonathan Cape (Penguin Books), Overlook Press (Abrams Books)
- Publication date: April 20, 2013
- English publication date: January 30, 2020
- Pages: 160 (English)
- ISBN: 9781419744396

Untold Night and Day (Korean: 알려지지 않은 밤과 하루; RR: Allyeojiji aneun bamgwa haru) is a 2013 novel by South Korean author Bae Suah. Set over a night and a day during a heatwave in Seoul, the novel follows Kim Ayami, a former actress finishing her final shift at the city's only audio theater for the blind. An English translation by Deborah Smith was published in 2020 by Jonathan Cape, an imprint of Penguin Books, in the United Kingdom and by The Overlook Press, an imprint of Abrams Books, in the United States. It was Bae's first work to be published in the UK.

== Background and Publication ==
Untold Night and Day was first serialized in 2012 in the literary quarterly Jaeum & Moeum, and was published in book form in April 2013 by the quarterly's publishing house, Jaeum & Moeum (자음과모음), coinciding with the twentieth anniversary of Bae's debut. It was her first full-length novel in two years. The novel is structured in four chapters designated only by numbers. A revised Korean edition was published by Jaeum & Moeum in May 2024.

Deborah Smith's English translation was published in 2020, making it Bae's first book to be published in the United Kingdom. An Italian translation, Notti invisibili, giorni sconosciuti, was published the same year with funding from the Literature Translation Institute of Korea.

== Plot ==
Twenty-eight-year-old Kim Ayami has worked for two years at Seoul's only audio theatre for the blind, which is shutting down, leaving her future uncertain. After her last shift, she walks the city's streets late into the night with her former boss, searching for a mutual friend who has disappeared. The following day, at that friend's request, Ayami acts as a guide for a detective novelist visiting from abroad. In the heat of the Seoul summer, order gives way to chaos, the edges of reality begin to fray, and the past intrudes on the present in increasingly disruptive ways.

== Critical reception ==
The Guardian described the book as a "hallucinatory novel propelled by the logic of dreams," writing that Bae layers her themes into a hidden code beneath the novel's meditative surface. The Observer called the novel a metaphysical detective story drawing on Korean shamanism, its storylines echoing one another, braided into a multilayered fictional universe. The Telegraph characterized Bae as the "Korean Kafka," describing the book as a surreal, disorienting and highly original novel, full of unsolved mysteries, repeated motifs and startling prose.

The Asian Review of Books offered a more mixed assessment, noting that reviewers had repeatedly described Bae's writing as "Lynchian," and finding the novel's effect disorienting, though original and poetic.

In South Korea, Newsis reviewed the novel upon its release in April 2013 under the headline "What kind of novel is this?", writing that it confirmed the aesthetic completion of the non-narrative and anti-narrative style Bae had been experimenting with across her short stories and novels since the 2000s, and situating it within a career that had expanded the grammar and horizons of Korean literature since her 1993 debut. Novelist Kim Sa-kwa urged readers of the novel to "give up and close your eyes. You will find yourself in a strange and precious dream, which will bring with it a rare joy."
