= National Engineering Forum =

- Founded: 2012
- Focus: Identifying actionable solutions to the challenges facing American engineering
- Location: Washington, DC, USA
- Website: www.nationalengineeringforum.com
- Twitter: @NatlEngForum

The National Engineering Forum (NEF) is an American movement based on the idea that the U.S. engineering enterprise fuels national security and economic prosperity, but that the nation’s engineers face a series of challenges threatening their profession’s sustainability. The movement is aimed at finding solutions to those challenges, identified by NEF as the 3C’s - capacity, capability and competitiveness:

- the capacity of technical talent to fill future jobs
- the engineering workforce’s capability to address 21st century challenges, and
- competitiveness in a global economy

Currently, NEF spotlights American engineers and the 3C’s via its newsletter and website, and acclaims engineering advancements on Twitter.

== History ==
In 2012, Lockheed Martin launched the National Engineering Forum, and then engaged the Council on Competitiveness and the National Academy of Engineering, which share a common vision for transforming the way we perceive, experience, and prioritize engineering in this country. NEF's initial focus included a five-year regional dialogue tour of key engineering hubs throughout the nation, including: New York; Knoxville, Tennessee; Albuquerque, New Mexico; Los Angeles; Columbus, Ohio; Houston; San Diego; Seattle; Detroit; Raleigh-Durham, North Carolina; Pittsburgh; Chicago; Boston; Atlanta; Phoenix; Madison, Wisconsin; Orlando, Florida; Stillwater, Oklahoma and Greenville, South Carolina.

In addition to sharing engineering news and features in its regular newsletter, in 2014 NEF released a report entitled Engineering our Nation's Future.
