= Institute for the International Education of Students =

Non-profit study abroad organization

IES Abroad
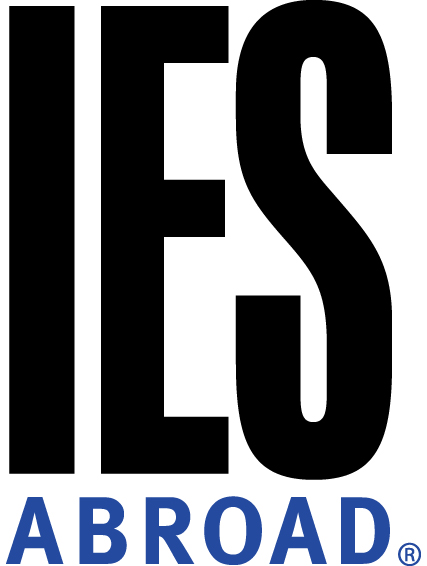
- Founded: 1950
- Founder: Paul Koutny, Clarence Giese, Alberta Giese
- Type: Not-for-profit (IRS exemption status): 501(c)(3)
- Purpose: Education, Study Abroad, Intercultural leadership
- Location: Chicago, IL, Headquarters
- Region served: Global
- Key people: Gregory D. Hess, Ph.D. President & CEO
- Employees: 250+
- Website: www.iesabroad.org
- Formerly called: The Institute of European Studies
- Member of NAFSA, Forum on education abroad, and Diversity Abroad

The Institute for the International Education of Students, or IES Abroad, is a non-profit study abroad organization that administers study abroad programs for U.S. college-aged students. Founded in 1950 as the Institute of European Studies, the organization has since been renamed to reflect additional offerings in Africa, Asia, Oceania, and Latin America. The organization now provides more than 140 programs in 32 cities across 29 countries, including direct enrollment, internships, multi-location, and customized & faculty-led programs. Over 190,000 students have studied abroad on IES Abroad programs since its founding, with more than 11,000 students studying abroad in 2025.

IES Abroad has an Academic Consortium composed of over 275 academic institutions. It has offered over $7.9 million in scholarships to help finance qualified students abroad, including the launch of the High-Impact Aid Commitment designed to increase access to study abroad. In accordance with its mission and vision statement, IES Abroad highlights cultural immersion through a variety of housing, including shared apartments, residence halls, and homestays. IES Abroad also offers field trips to "[promote] the development of interculturally-competent leaders." IES Abroad's services include pre-departure advising, alumni mentors, and safety plans at Centers abroad with a dedicated Crisis Management Team. IES Abroad offers visa assistance, including an ACCeSS program designed to support students in the process. IES Abroad offers student support through ENGAGE (Encouraging New Growth About Global Experiences), a cohort-based program integrated into the study abroad semester that supports student development and intercultural learning, as well as through their inclusivity initiative and identity resources. IES Abroad also has a Global Good Commitment, aimed at outlining sustainability efforts and goals.

== History ==
IES Abroad offered its first program in September 1950, when Paul Koutny, an Austrian student living in the U.S. on a Fulbright scholarship, brought American students to live and study in Vienna, Austria for a year. Two of the students from the original program, newlyweds Clarence and Alberta Giese, returned after the program inspired to help other students study abroad. From their Chicago home, they worked with Koutny to recruit more students and send them abroad.

William Louis Gaines, the son of a railroad worker who served in World War II and marched with Martin Luther King Jr., served as president of IES from 1974 until his 1992 retirement "through some of its most challenging years".

IES Abroad developed a Model Assessment Practice in 1999 as a framework for the design, development, and evaluation of programs of study abroad. This program formed the basis for the standards of the Forum on Education Abroad adopted by the field. In 2010, IES Abroad was the first third-party provider to receive the Forum on Education Abroad's Category 2b Quality Improvement Designation, which involves independent reviewers using evaluation systems to make program improvements.

== Notable alumni ==
- Amanda Gorman
- Donald Hopkins
- Willard Huyck
- John Irving
- Michael Isikoff
- Charles E. Merrill Jr.
- David Muir
- Janet Napolitano
- Sonia Nazario
- Adrienne S. O'Neal
- Mark Kennedy Shriver
- Daniel Quinn
- Mark Yakich

== See also ==
- NAFSA: Association of International Educators
- Institute of International Education
- Forum on education abroad
- Study abroad in the United States
- Study abroad organization
