= Peter Green (historian) =

British historian and novelist (1924–2024)

- Born: 22 December 1924; London, England, United Kingdom
- Died: 16 September 2024 (aged 99) Iowa City, Iowa, United States
- Allegiance: United Kingdom
- Spouse: Carin (died 2015)
- Children: Sarah and 2 others

Peter Morris Green (22 December 1924 – 16 September 2024) was an English classical scholar and novelist noted for his works on the Greco-Persian Wars, Alexander the Great and the Hellenistic Age of ancient history, generally regarded as spanning the era from the death of Alexander in 323 BC up to either the date of the Battle of Actium or the death of Augustus in 14 AD.

Green's most famous books are Alexander of Macedon, a historical biography first issued in 1970, then in a revised and expanded edition in 1974, which was first published in the United States in 1991; his Alexander to Actium, a general account of the Hellenistic Age, and other works. He was the author of a translation of the Satires of the Roman poet Juvenal, now in its third edition. He also contributed poems to many journals, including to Arion and the Southern Humanities Review. He was elected a Fellow of the Royal Society of Literature in 1956.

== Early life and career ==
Green was born in London on 22 December 1924. He went to school at Charterhouse. During World War II, he served with the Royal Air Force in Burma. In Firpo's Bar in Calcutta, he met and became friendly with future novelist, Paul Scott, who later used elements of Green's character for the figure of Sergeant Guy Perron in The Raj Quartet.

After the war, Green attended Trinity College, Cambridge, where he achieved a Double First in Classics, winning the Craven Scholarship and Studentship in 1950. He subsequently wrote historical novels and worked as a journalist, in the capacity of fiction critic for the Daily Telegraph (1953–63), book columnist for the Yorkshire Post (1961–62), television critic for The Listener (1962–1963), film critic for John O'London's (1961–1963), as well as contributing to other journals.

In 1963, he and his family moved to the Greek island of Lesbos, where he was a translator and independent scholar. In 1966 he moved to Athens, where he was recruited to teach classics for College Year in Athens, and published Armada from Athens, a study of the Sicilian Expedition of 415–3 BC (1970), and The Year of Salamis, a history of the Greco-Persian Wars (1971). In 1971, Green was invited to teach at the University of Texas at Austin, where he became Dougherty Centennial Professor of Classics in 1982, emeritus from 1997. In 1986, he held the Mellon Chair of Humanities at Tulane University in New Orleans. He was last an adjunct professor at the University of Iowa and also has held visiting appointments at Princeton University and at East Carolina University in Greenville, North Carolina.

Bob Dylan used Green's translations of Ovid, found in The Erotic Poems (1982) and The Poems of Exile: Tristia and the Black Sea Letters (1994) as song lyrics on the albums Love and Theft (2001) and Modern Times (2006).

Green was a regular contributor to the New York Review of Books.

At the time of his death, Green was working with Glenn Storey on a new translation of the works of Herodotus with full commentaries. That work is expected to be published in 2025.

== Personal life and death ==
In 1954, Green married Lalage Isobel Pulvertaft, a novelist and Egyptologist. They had three children, including Sarah Green.

Green's second marriage was to classicist and ancient historian Carin M. C. Green, who died in 2015.

Peter Green died in Iowa City on 16 September 2024, at the age of 99.

== Bibliography ==
- The Expanding Eye - A First Journey To The Mediterranean (1952) Illustrated with photographs.
- Habeas Corpus And Other Stories (1954) (eight short stories)
- Achilles His Armour (1955) (historical novel about Alcibiades and the Peloponnesian War).
- Cat in Gloves (Under pseudonym Denis Delaney) (1956), Gryphon Books
- The Sword of Pleasure (1957) (fictional memoirs of Sulla)
- Kenneth Grahame: A Biography: The Dramatic and Human Story of the Fascinating and Complex Man Who Wrote The Wind in the Willows (1959)
- Writers & their Work - Sir Thomas Browne (1959), Longman for The British Council
- Writers & their Work - John Skelton (1960), Longman for the British Council
- Essays in Antiquity (1960)
- Destiny of Fire by Zoe Oldenbourg (translation of Les Brûlés) (1961)
- Massacre at Montségur by Zoe Oldenbourg (translation of Le Bûcher de Montségur) (1961)
- The Life of Jesus by Jean Steinmann (translation) (1963)
- The Laughter of Aphrodite: A Novel About Sappho of Lesbos (1965)
- The Sixteen Satires by Juvenal (translation) (1967)
- The Year of Salamis, 480-479 BC (1970) (UK) = Xerxes at Salamis (1970) (USA)
- Alexander the Great (1970)
- Armada from Athens (1970)
- The Shadow of the Parthenon: Studies in Ancient History and Literature (1972)
- The Parthenon (1973)
- A Concise History of Ancient Greece to the Close of the Classical Era (1973)
- Alexander of Macedon, 356–323 B.C.; A Historical Biography (1974; re-issue in U.S., 1991, as indicated below)
- Ancient Greece: An Illustrated History (1979)
- Ovid: The Erotic Poems (1982)
- Classical Bearings: Interpreting Ancient History and Culture (1989)
- Alexander to Actium: The Historical Evolution of the Hellenistic Age (1990)
- Alexander of Macedon, 356-323 B.C.: A Historical Biography (1991)
- Ovid: The Poems of Exile: Tristia and the Black Sea Letters (1994)
- The Argonautika by Apollonios Rhodios (translation) (1997)
- The Greco-Persian Wars (1996) (update of The Year of Salamis)
- From Ikaria to the Stars: Classical Mythification, Ancient and Modern (2004)
- The Poems of Catullus (2005)
- Diodorus Siculus, Books 11–12.37.1 : Greek history 480–431 B.C.—the Alternative Version, Austin, University of Texas Press, 2006.
- Alexander The Great and the Hellenistic Age (2007)
- The Hellenistic Age: A Short History (2007)
- The Iliad by Homer (translation) (2015)
- The Odyssey by Homer (translation) (2018)

=== Book reviews ===
Year	Review article	Work(s) reviewed
2007	"The Women and the Gods". The New York Review of Books. 54 (11): 32–35. 28 June 2007.	Connelly, Joan Breton (2007). Portrait of a Priestess: Women and Ritual in Ancient Greece. Princeton, N.J.: Princeton University Press.

=== Critical studies and reviews of Green's work ===
The Odyssey (2018)

- Burrow, Colin (26 April 2018). "Light through the fog". London Review of Books. 40 (8): 3–7.
