= Debbie Smith =

Debbie or Deborah Smith may refer to:

- Debbie Smith (musician), British guitarist and bassist in bands including Echobelly and Curve
- Debbie Smith (Nevada politician) (1956–2016), representing the Washoe 30 District
- Debbie Smith (Wentworth), a character in TV series Wentworth
- Deborah Smith (novelist), American novelist
- Deborah Smith (translator) (born 1987), translator of Korean fiction into English
- Deborah Salem Smith, American poet and playwright
- The Debbie Smith Act, a U.S. federal law
- Debbie Smith, member of Ohio band Chi-Pig
- Deborah L. Wince-Smith, president of the United States Council on Competitiveness

== See also ==
- Debi Smith, American folk singer-songwriter
