= Samuel R. Allen =

American businessman (born c. 1953)

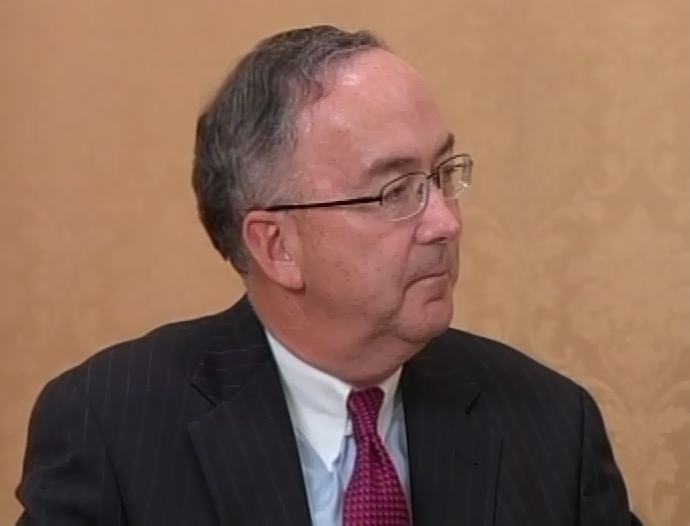
- Samuel Allen (2010)
- Born: c. 1953 (age 72–73); Sumter, South Carolina, U.S.
- Education: Purdue University
- Occupations: Businessman, CEO of John Deere
- Employer: John Deere
- Term: 2010-2019
- Predecessor: Robert W. Lane
- Successor: John C. May

Samuel R. Allen (born c. 1953) is an American businessman. He was the chairman and chief executive officer of John Deere, and the chairman of the U.S. Council on Competitiveness.

== Early life ==
Samuel R. Allen was born circa 1953 in Sumter, South Carolina. He attended Purdue University as an Evans Scholar and graduated with a Bachelor of Science in Industrial Management in 1975.

== Career ==
Allen started his career at John Deere in 1975, where he first worked as an industrial engineer. He became the company's president and chief operating officer in June 2009. Allen was the chairman and chief executive officer of Deere & Company from February 2010 to November 2019. In 2016, he earned more than US$18 million.

As of 2017, Allen serves as the chairman of the U.S. Council on Competitiveness. He has served on the board of directors of Whirlpool Corporation since June 2010.

In March 2020, Allen announced his retirement as board chairman of Deere & Company.
