= Study abroad in the United States =

U.S. students studying in foreign countries

Some students from the United States pursue educational opportunities outside the United States. This can include primary, secondary and post-secondary students.

Most outgoing U.S. students study abroad for one or two academic terms. The majority of US students now choose short-term study abroad programs according to the most recent Institute of International Education Open Doors Report. In the 2008–09 academic year, the five countries US students chose to study abroad in most were the United Kingdom, Italy, Spain, France, and China. The total number of US students studying abroad during 2008–2009 was 260,327, compared to 262,416 the previous year, a modest decline of 0.8%. In the 2011–2012 academic year 283,332 US students opted to study abroad, a 0.9% increase from 2008–2009; however, US students who choose to study abroad represent only 1% of all students enrolled in higher education institutions. The Open Doors report is published annually by the Institute of International Education with funding from the U.S. Department of State's Bureau of Educational and Cultural Affairs. However, the report found that there were notable increases in the number of U.S. students going to study in less traditional destinations. Fifteen of the top 25 destinations were outside of Western Europe and nineteen were countries where English is not a primary language.

While the data from the Open Doors Report is still wide-ranging, it is not entirely inclusive of all study abroad student data that had previously been included in the annual reports. As of 2013, according to the Open Doors' FAQs regarding the question of 'Who is counted in the U.S. Study Abroad survey?': "students who travel and take courses abroad that are not tracked by their home institution are not reported in Open Doors, nor are students who are enrolled overseas for full degrees from non-U.S. institutions."

== History ==
The University of Delaware is credited with creating the first study abroad program designed for U.S. undergraduate students in the 1920s.

A few decades later, Professor Raymond W. Kirkbride of the University of Delaware, a French professor and World War I veteran, won support from university president Walter S. Hullihen to send students to study in France in their junior year. UD initially refused to fund Kirkbride's travels, and he and Hullihen appealed to prominent public and private figures for support including then-Secretary of Commerce Herbert Hoover and businessman Pierre S. du Pont. Kirkbride set sail for on July 7, 1923, with eight students for six weeks of intensive language courses in Nancy, France, before moving on to Paris to study at The Sorbonne. The Delaware Foreign Study Plan, which came to be known as the Junior Year Abroad (JYA), was considered a success and was replicated by other U.S. institutions such as Smith College. In 1948, the Delaware Foreign Study Plan was discontinued due to post-war conditions in Europe and shifting priorities under a new university president. It has since been re-instated in the form of their current study abroad program.

100 Years of Study Abroad: Reflections from University Students, Alumni, Faculty, and Staff, a book published by Ammigan et al., commemorates a century of global learning at the University of Delaware and brings together a collection of personal essays that capture the profound impact of studying across diverse cultural and national contexts.

Education and expenses for the students primarily comes from personal or family source, foreign government, or overseas sponsors. The decline in influx of the international students coming to US has caused an economic loss of $1.17 billion to United States.

== Trend ==
Despite flat overall study abroad numbers, there were notable increases in the numbers of U.S. students going to some of the less traditional destinations for study abroad in 2008/09. Double digit increases to host countries among the top 25 destinations include Argentina, Chile, Denmark, the Netherlands, Peru, South Africa and South Korea. Double-digit decreases among the top 25 host countries include Mexico (which experienced H1N1 virus outbreak that year), Austria and India.

The following table represented the top 25 studied abroad destinations for U.S. students seeking academic credited in 2007/08 and 2008/09, according to the Institute of International Education.

According to NAFSAs website, "the number of U.S. students studying abroad for credit during the 2013–2014 academic year grew 5.2 percent from 289,408 students to 304,467 students. This represents just under 1.5 percent of all U.S. students enrolled at institutions of higher education in the United States and about 10 percent of U.S. graduates. A recent survey found that almost 40% of companies surveyed missed international business opportunities because of a lack of internationally competent personnel. When 95% of consumers live outside of the United States, we cannot afford to ignore this essential aspect of higher education."

See the following chart displaying their most recent study done on the percentage of United States abroad students by their race/ethnicity.

Race/Ethnicity	U.S. Postsecondary Enrollment 2013–2014	U.S. Students Abroad 2013–2014
African American or Black	17.7%	5.6%
Asian/Pacific Islander	6.4%	7.7%
Caucasian	59.3%	74.3%
Hispanic/Latino American	15.8%	8.3%
Multiracial	2.9%	3.6%
American Indian/Alaska Native	0.8%	0.5%

Rank	Destination	2007/08	2008/09	2008/09 % of Total	% Change
	World Total	262,416	260,327	100.0	−0.8
1	United Kingdom	33,333	31,342	12.0	−6.0
2	Italy	30,670	27,362	10.5	−10.8
3	Spain	25,212	24,169	9.3	−4.1
4	France	17,336	16,910	6.5	−2.5
5	China	13,165	13,674	5.3	3.9
6	Australia	11,042	11,140	4.3	0.9
7	Germany	8,253	8,330	3.2	0.9
8	Mexico	9,928	7,320	2.8	−26.3
9	Ireland	6,881	6,858	2.6	−0.3
10	Costa Rica	6,096	6,363	2.4	4.4
11	Japan	5,710	5,784	2.2	1.3
12	Argentina	4,109	4,705	1.8	14.5
13	South Africa	3,700	4,160	1.6	12.4
14	Czech Republic	3,417	3,664	1.4	7.2
15	Greece	3,847	3,616	1.4	−6.0
16	Chile	2,739	3,503	1.3	27.9
17	Ecuador	2,814	2,859	1.1	1.6
18	Austria	3,356	2,836	1.1	−15.5
19	Brazil	2,723	2,777	1.1	2.0
20	New Zealand	2,629	2,769	1.1	5.3
21	India	3,146	2,690	1.0	−14.5
22	Netherlands	2,038	2,318	0.9	13.7
23	Denmark	1,855	2,244	0.9	21.0
24	Peru	1,638	2,163	0.8	32.1
25	South Korea	1,597	2,062	0.8	29.1

== Types of programs ==
Despite the slight decline in U.S. students studying abroad for credit in 2008–2009, study abroad is likely to continue to grow. The number of outgoing U.S. students pursuing overseas study has increased over fivefold since the late 1980s, from less than 50,000 students to more than 260,000 in 2008–09. Behind the numbers, though, has been the proliferation in the type study abroad programs. According to Lilli Engel of the American University Center of Provence, there are fundamental differences in the academic and cultural experience offered by study abroad programs today that suggest the need to create a level-based classification system for program types. In a Frontiers: The Interdisciplinary Journal of Study Abroad article, she compares "a one-month summer term, requiring little or no host language proficiency, with subject-matter classes in English, collective housing and American roommates" with "a full-year program for students of advanced linguistic proficiency housed individually in a host family and directly enrolled in local university courses or engaged in a professional internship or service-learning project."

Motivation, interaction and their connection to developing a second-language was examined by Todd A. Hernández of Marquette University. In terms of language acquisition, there is more to learning a language than just the assumption "that study abroad is superior to home education...". It is the interaction of the individual with the option of various opportunities, the exchange of language and ideas across cultures and the interpersonal connections established within various social settings. When these characteristics are pursued in study abroad, many researchers have found the "this sustained interaction is an important improvement in a Study Abroad context... contributing to language gain."

Yet, within international education, a universally accepted method of classifying study abroad programs has proven elusive. U.S. students can choose from a wide range of study-abroad opportunities differentiated by program sponsor, curriculum, cost, program model, language and degree of integration, to name a few. While study abroad in the U.S. is by no means uniform, study abroad programs can reasonably be grouped according to (a) duration, (b) program model (c) program sponsor.

=== Duration ===
Study abroad programs are available to students throughout the year. However, the majority enroll in Semester or Summer programs (37.3% and 35.8%). Even though the total number of outbound U.S. students grew by over 100,000 from 2000/01 to 2008/09, the percentages of students studying abroad during a given term remained largely stable. However, the long-term trends of steadily relatively fewer students signing up for Academic Year programs in favor of growing enrollments in programs less than 8 weeks during the Academic Year. For working and community college students study abroad can also last as short as a week.

Duration of U.S. Study Abroad (% of Total), 1999/00 – 2008/09

Term Abroad	2000/01	2001/02	2002/03	2003/04	2004/05	2005/06	2006/07	2007/08	2008/09
Summer Term	33.7	34.4	32.7	37.0	37.2	37.2	38.7	38.1	35.8
One Semester	38.5	39.0	40.3	38.1	37.5	36.9	36.3	35.5	37.3
8 Weeks or Less During Academic year	7.4	7.3	9.4	8.9	8.0	9.5	9.8	11.0	11.7
January Term	7.0	6.0	5.6	5.7	6.0	5.4	6.8	7.2	7.0
Academic Year	7.3	7.8	6.7	6.0	6.0	5.3	4.3	4.1	4.1
One Quarter	4.1	3.9	3.8	3.3	3.3	3.3	3.4	3.4	3.3
Two Quarters	0.6	0.5	0.4	0.5	1.3	0.9	0.5	0.6	0.5
Total	154,168	160,920	174,629	191,321	205,983	223,534	241,791	262,416	260,327

=== Four basic program models ===
Four basic models have been identified to refer to a study abroad program's structure. They consist of (a) Island, (b) Integrated, (c) Hybrid, and (d) Field-study programs.

- Island – Students participating in island programs study alongside other American students in a study center. Island programs are typically sponsored U.S. universities and/or third-party providers, who develop a curriculum specifically with American students in mind.
- Integrated – Students who participate on an integrated program enroll directly in courses alongside local students at a host university. Program sponsors may provide additional services such as assistance with course registration and language tutoring.
- Hybrid – Hybrid programs include elements of both island and integrated program. Typically students take a selection of their coursework at a host university and the remainder at a study center. Hybrid programs are common in countries where the primary language of instruction is not English, such as China and Morocco.
- Field-based – Field-based study abroad programs for academic credit are structured much more liberally than traditional island, integrated or hybrid programs. Generally these programs involve a thematic focus, field study training and finally an independent study project. SIT Study Abroad programs are for the most part field-based.

=== Program sponsor ===
Programs can also be grouped and classified by identifying a program's sponsor. Sponsors are the institutions and/or circumstances that led to a program's creation, as well as what the goal of a program is. The main study abroad program sponsors are (a) host university (direct exchange and direct enroll), (b) U.S. college or university (study centers and international branch campuses), and (c) study abroad organizations known as third-party providers.

Host University Sponsor: direct exchange and direct enroll

Many U.S. institutions have long-standing direct exchange partnerships with foreign institutions that allow their students to enroll in classes as a visiting student while still paying standard tuition at their home university. Direct exchanges are facilitated by agreements governing academic credit transfer and financial aid between the home university and host university. While individual agreements may vary, direct exchange typically involves a 1:1 where the number of inbound exchange must be equivalent to the number of outgoing study abroad students. Typically, students enroll in standard courses at the host institution and are fully integrated with host country students and are responsible for their own housing, airport transfer, etc. Programs are administered on-site by the host university, with pre-departure advising and assistance from a U.S. university study abroad office.

Like direct exchange, direct enrollment programs are generally geared toward the more independent student, as participants enroll in courses directly alongside local students. Students are responsible for their housing and coordinating other logistics. Unlike direct exchanges, direct enrollment does not necessarily require an agreement between the U.S. institution and the foreign university. As such, credit transfer is not automatic and participants pay tuition and fees directly to the host university.

Sponsored by U.S. College and Universities: study centers and international branch campuses

Some of the most popular study abroad programs include those sponsored by a student's home institution, by another U.S. college or university, or by a consortium of U.S. colleges or universities. These programs are designed to allow students to study in a foreign environment while remaining within a U.S. academic framework. Credit transfer is arranged by the sponsoring and programs typically align with traditional U.S. academic calendars. The U.S. sponsor institution will typically assist with housing arrangements, and may arrange cultural activities and excursions for participating students. Study center are known as "island programs" because create separate classes and spaces for U.S. and foreign students.

Participants may take classes at a study center or international branch campus run by the U.S. college or university sponsor. The curriculum of study centers are specifically designed for study abroad students. For example, students at Texas Tech University's Seville, Spain program study with TTU faculty, take TTU courses with other TTU students and earn TTU credit. International branch campuses, however, are distinct in that U.S. study abroad students enroll in classes alongside full degree-seeking students. As an example, Florida State University Panama Canal Branch offers a broad curriculum and the majority of its students are Panamanian or are from other countries in Latin America, notably Colombia and Costa Rica. Today, U.S. colleges and universities operate at least 80 international branch campuses worldwide.

Sponsored by third-party providers

Third-party providers are private companies and organizations that sponsor study abroad programs. Both for-profit and non-profit third-party providers assist program participants with logistics like course registration and housing arrangements. While models differ, academic and social guidance is generally included throughout the duration of a program, as are built-in excursions and community service opportunities.

Third-party providers of all stripes pursue relationships with U.S. universities in the form of affiliation agreements or membership consortia agreements. There are many third-party providers in operation in the United States.

=== Fields of study ===
Total number of foreign students from all places of origin by field of study 2015-2016

Rank	Field of Study	Number of Students	Per cent of Total
1	Business and Management	200,312	19.2%
2	Engineering	216,932	20.8%
3	Other/Unspecified Subject Areas	185,107	17.7%
4	Mathematics and Computer Sciences	141,651	13.6%
5	Social Sciences	81,304	7.8%
6	Physical and Life Sciences	75,385	7.2%
7	Humanities	17,664	1.7%
8	Fine and Applied Arts	59,736	5.7%
9	Health Professions	33,947	3.3%
10	Education	19,483	1.9%
11	Agriculture	12,318	1.2%

== Funding study abroad ==
Costs for a study abroad program include, but are not limited to tuition and fees, room and board, medical insurance, passport and visa fees and transportation costs. While U.S. universities vary in terms of policies related to financing study abroad, financial aid for U.S. students who wish to study abroad may include a combination of scholarships, grants from the home university, government student loans, and private student loans.

An amendments made in 1992 to the Higher Education Act of 1965, TITLE VI, SEC. 601-604 in the U.S. ruled that students can receive financial aid for study abroad if they are enrolled in a program that is approved by their home institution and would be eligible to receive government funding without regard to whether the study abroad program is required as a part of the student's degree.

=== Federal grants ===
- The Pell Grant – The Pell Grant is a need-based grant. To qualify, you must be a full-time undergraduate student with an Expected Family Contribution (EFC) below the limit determined each year
- The Federal Supplemental Education Opportunities Grant – This need-based grant is awarded to those students demonstrating the greatest financial need. Students typically must qualify for the federal Pell Grant to receive an SEOG Grant

=== Federal loans ===
- Federal Stafford Loan – The Stafford Loan is in the student's name and is available to all students, regardless of financial need. If the loan is subsidized, the government will pay the interest while the student is in school. If the loan is unsubsidized, there is the choice of capitalizing the interest or of paying the interest quarterly during the in-school period. Payment of the principle itself (for both subsidized and unsubsidized loans) does not begin until six months after graduation, provided the student remains enrolled on at least a half-time (six credits) basis.
- Federal Perkins Loan – The Perkins Loan is a low-interest loan (5 percent) awarded to those students demonstrating the greatest financial need.
- Parent PLUS Loans for Undergraduate Students – Parents may borrow up to the full cost of a student's education, less the amount of any other financial aid received. There is a minimal credit check required for the PLUS loan, so a good credit history is required.

=== Federal scholarships ===
- David L. Boren Undergraduate Scholarships for Study Abroad – The National Security Education Program (NSEP) provides scholarships to undergraduate students who wish to study languages and cultures considered to be important to U.S. national security. Students are not eligible to receive the Boren scholarship if they are studying in Australia, Austria, Belgium, Canada, Denmark, Finland, France, Germany, Greece, Iceland, Ireland, Italy, Luxembourg, the Netherlands, New Zealand, Norway, Portugal, Spain, Sweden, Switzerland, or the United Kingdom.
- Benjamin A. Gilman International Scholarship – If you receive a federal Pell Grant, you are eligible to apply for a Gilman Scholarship.

== Criticism ==
In mid-2007, New York's attorney general opened an inquiry into the relationships between universities and providers of foreign study. According to Benjamin Lawsky, former deputy counselor in the office of Attorney General Andrew M. Cuomo, the inquiry was to focus on whether cash incentives and other perks that foreign-study providers give universities influence their decisions about where students may study. Critics contend that the practices, rarely disclosed and largely unknown, limit study abroad options and drive up the price that is ultimately passed onto students. The investigation follows disclosures in The New York Times that providers of study abroad are offering colleges rebates, free and subsidized travel, unpaid seats on advisory boards, help with back-office services and marketing stipends. In some cases, perks are tied to the number of students universities send to a given provider's program. When asked, Lawsky said that the inquiry grew out of his office's inquiries into similar practices in the student loan industry.

As part of the investigation, Cuomo's office issued subpoenas for five of the major study abroad providers in August 2007. The first batch of providers were the Institute for Study Abroad at Butler University, the American Institute For Foreign Study, the Institute for the International Education of Students; the Center for Education Abroad at Arcadia University, and the Danish Institute for Study Abroad. Six months later, he issued subpoenas or requests for documents top 15 colleges in and out of New York State. In light of the unprecedented attention on the industry, NAFSA: Association of International Educators drafted a report in early 2008 calling on U.S. university study abroad offices to be more open in their decision making and to demonstrate that their policies directly benefit students.

Also in response to Cuomo's investigation, The Forum on Education Abroad released a code of ethics in March 2008 that sought to be a "compass" for U.S. universities, study abroad providers and foreign host institutions. Unlike the NAFSA report, The Forum document offers a broad set of ethical principles and detailed guidance. It recommends, amongst other things, that U.S. institutions have specific procedures for reporting payments, like honoraria and consulting fees, for work done on behalf of providers; that agreements and criteria for selecting study abroad programs be disclosed fully; and that the goals and parameters for visits by campus officials to overseas program sites be clearly established in advance of the trips. The Forum is a consortium of American and overseas colleges and outside providers founded in 2001 to create standards of good practices for education abroad.

== Benefits ==
It has been shown that through study abroad, students can gain a better understanding of themselves, and of their culture. They improve their ability to evaluate elements of their own culture in an unbiased manner. It has also been shown that students who study abroad are more appreciative of their own culture and not just the culture that they visited. Some even say studying abroad can become a "reverse culture shock" with the differences of students when they return to their own culture. In addition, multicultural interactions become smoother and more natural for the students for the rest of their lives. It has been shown that 96% have increased self-confidence, 97% feel more mature and 98% understand their own values more clearly. Research suggests that when paired together, the use of social media and study abroad programs make second language acquisition much less difficult. Michele Back, Assistant Professor of World Languages Education at the University of Connecticut, conducted research on the positive influence Facebook has on second language acquisition for students participating in study abroad programs. Her work demonstrated that students who used Facebook to interact with native speakers, before and after their study abroad experience, found it easier to maintain long term interactions in their target language—further enhancing their second language acquisition. The study Short-Term Education Abroad and Global Competence: Assessing Student Outcomes and Program Impact, reinforces the value of short-term education abroad programs as impactful pathways for developing intercultural skills. It also explores how students experience and understand resilience while immersed in new environments.
