= Sarah Green (anthropologist) =

Social anthropologist

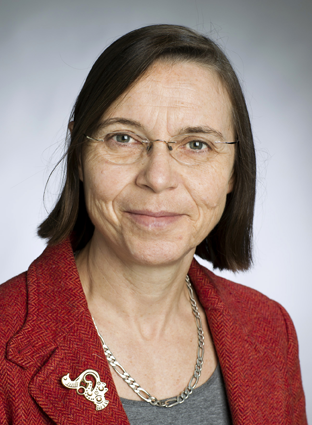
Sarah F. Green, October 2012. Photo: Ari Aalto, University of Helsinki

Sarah Francesca Green (born 9 March 1961) is a professor of social and cultural anthropology at the University of Helsinki. She is a specialist on borders, spatial relations, gender and sexuality, and information and communications technologies. She has lived in Greece, the UK, US, Italy and in Helsinki, Finland. In September 2016, Green was awarded a European Research Council (ERC) Advanced Grant to develop new research in the Mediterranean region. She was also awarded an Academy of Finland Project, called Transit, Trade and Travel, which also concerns the Mediterranean, though its focus is different.

== Life and career ==
Sarah Green was born in Redgrave, Suffolk. Her parents were the classicist Peter Green and Lalage Isobel Pulvertaft, a novelist and Egyptologist. She grew up in Lesbos and Athens, where she first attended school. Following the move of her family to the UK, she continued school there. After a short period at the University of Texas at Austin, she moved back to the UK and became an undergraduate at the University of Cambridge (New Hall, now Murray Edwards College) to study the archaeology and anthropology Tripos. After another short period in the US, she began doctoral studies at Cambridge in 1988, and obtained her PhD in social anthropology in 1992. Her professional career began as a research fellow and an affiliated lecturer at the University of Cambridge, from where she moved to Manchester University in 1995. In 2006, she was appointed as a Professor of Anthropology at the University of Manchester, where she also served as the Head of Social Anthropology (2007-2010). Green has also held visiting appointments in other UK Universities, as well as in Finland.

In 2016, Green was awarded a European Research Council (ERC) Advanced Grant called Crosslocations, which developed a new theoretical and ethnographic approach towards the study of location, borders and the importance of being somewhere in particular. That research led to a major new focus on the cross-border movement of non-human animals (livestock, wild animals) and the circulation of microbes. She is currently focusing entirely on that aspect of her research.

In June 2024, Green was awarded an honorary doctorate at the University of Eastern Finland for her contributions to borders research. She has also been elected to be a member of The Academy of Europe (Academia Europaea), the Finnish Society of Sciences and Letters, and in July 2025 was elected as an overseas Fellow of the British Academy.

== Research interests and fieldwork ==
Although the subject matter of her research varies considerably, Green’s major conceptual interest has been consistently on the notion of location, and most recently, that have involved a focus on human-animal spatial relations. Throughout her diverse fieldwork projects she has been exploring, in both literal and metaphorical senses, how people locate themselves and how they locate other living beings in the world and in relation to themselves and others. For Green such locating practices are inextricably linked to political conditions, as well as social and epistemological elements. Her research is currently focusing on understanding the way people locate, both physically and conceptually, non-human animals and microbes, and how that affects their interactions. Her previous research included: the politics of gender and sexuality in London; the politics of the intense promotion of Information and Communications Technologies in Manchester; shifting perceptions of environment and land degradation in the Argolid Valley and northwestern Greece; concepts of border relations on the Greek-Albanian border; the appearance, disappearance and reappearance of the Balkans; the circulation of money in the Aegean; the notion of trust and the UK's new financial elites; the shifting concept of border in the eastern peripheries of Europe; and the locational dynamics of the Mediterranean region.

A considerable portion of her research work has been, and continues to be, undertaken in the context of interdisciplinary research teams. Early on in her career Green participated in Archaeomedes I and II (1993-2000), which were EU-funded projects exploring environmental perceptions and policy making. From 2004 onwards she has been involved in various research activities as a co-ordinator within the ESRC Centre for Research in Socio-Cultural Change. Since 2006, she has been developing an international research network dedicated to exploring both conceptually and empirically issues related to borders and bordering practices on the eastern periphery of Europe. EastBordNet was funded by COST (Cooperation of Science and Technology in Europe) in 2008 and Green acted as the PI and chair of the Action. A range of themes related to border research (border techniques, gender, money, etc.) have been explored and a fresh conceptual approach towards the study of borders has been developed (e.g. tidemarks). The network included 27 countries and over 280 scholars by the time (Jan 2013) it held its second international conference in Berlin. The network continues, though it is no longer funded by COST. The Manchester University Press book series Rethinking Borders is co-edited by Green and Hastings Donnan; the series features monographs and edited collections that develop new thinking about location and border dynamics. research coming out of the EastBordNet project.

In 2011, she was invited to be the executive program director of the American Anthropological Association, which is the biggest international conference in the field of anthropology and was hosted in Montreal. She was also the former chair of the External Advisory Board between 2013 and 2017 of HAU: Journal of Ethnographic Theory.

== Selected publications ==
- 2024 An Anthropology of Crosslocations. Co-authored with Samuli Lähteenaho, Phaedra Douzina-Bakalaki, Carl Rommel, Joseph Viscomi, Laia Soto Bermant and Patricia Scalco. Helsinki: Helsinki University Press. Book is both monograph and ‘multigraph’ in being collective outcome of Crosslocations project. Open access. doi:10.33134/HUP-23
- 2023 “Standardizing Animal Mobility and Locations: Theorizing the Contemporary” Cultural Anthropology, Series on Plantationocene. https://culanth.org/fieldsights/standardizing-animal-mobility-and-locations
- 2023 with Laia Soto Bermant: “Anthropology of the Mediterranean.” Oxford research encyclopedia of anthropology. Aldenderfer, M. S. (ed.). New York, NY: Oxford University Press, pp. 1-22
- 2022 “The Bioeconomics of Domesticating Zoonoses” Cultural Anthropology Vol. 37, No. 1, pp. 30-36 doi:10.14506/ca37.1.05
- 2022 The Hedgehog from Jordan: or, how to locate the movement of wild animals in a partially Mediterranean context. In Joseph Viscomi & Carl Rommel, (eds), Locating the Mediterranean: Connections and Separations across Time and Space, pp. 199-221. Helsinki: Helsinki University Press. https://hup.fi/site/chapters/e/10.33134/HUP-18-9/
- 2022 Crosslocations: looking for somewhere in particular across the Mediterranean edited and co-authored with Lena Malm, Niinu Koskenalho, Samuli Lähteenaho, Laia Soto Bermant, Patricia Scalco, Phaedra Douzina-Bakalaki, and Carl Rommel. Helsinki: Rosebud Books. ISBN 978-952-7313-38-1 (Print) 978-952-7313-41-1 (Electronic).
- 2021 Locating Disease: On the Co-Existence of Diverse Concepts of Territory and the Spread of Disease. In Sevasti Trubeta, Christian Promitser & Paul Weindling, (eds), Medicalising borders: Selection, containment and quarantine since 1800, Manchester: Manchester University Press, pp. 178-198
- 2020 Geometries: from analogy to performativity. In Franck Billé, (ed.) Volumetric States: sovereignty, materiality, and the territorial imagination, Durham and London: Duke University Press, 175-90.
- 2020 Σημειώσεις από τα Βαλκάνια. Τόπος, Περιθωριακότητα και αμφισημία στα Ελληνοαλβανικά σύνορα. Ιωάννινα Εκδόσεις Ισνάφι. Greek language version of Notes from the Balkans (see below, 2005), with an Introduction by Alexandra Bakalaki and a new Preface by Sarah Green. Translated by Aspasia Theodosiou and Alexandra Siotou. ISBN 978-960-9446-26-0.
- 2018 Lines, traces, and tidemarks: further reflections on forms of border, in The political materialities of borders: new theoretical directions. Demetriou, O. & Dimova, R. (eds.). 1 ed. Manchester: University of Manchester, Vol. 2. p. 67-83 17 p.
- 2017 "Thinking through proliferations of geometries, fractions and parts." Conclusion and Summary of the work of Marilyn Strathern, in Ashley Lebner (ed), Redescribing Relations: Strathernian conversations on ethnography, knowledge and politics. Oxford: Berghahn, pp. 197-207
- 2013 “Borders and the Relocation of Europe.” Annual Review of Anthropology. Vol. 42, pp. 345-361 (http://www.annualreviews.org/doi/pdf/10.1146/annurev-anthro-092412-155457)
- 2013 Borderwork: a visual journey through periphery frontier regions. With Lena Malm. Helsinki: Jasilti.
- 2010 “Performing Border in the Aegean: on relocating political, economic and social relations.” In the Journal of Cultural Economy, Vol. 3, No.2, pp 261-278.
- 2005. (with Penny Harvey and Hannah Knox): “Scales of Place and Networks: an ethnography of the imperative to connect through information and communications technologies.” Current Anthropology Vol. 46, No. 5, pp. 805-826.
- 2005 Notes from the Balkans: Locating Marginality and Ambiguity on the Greek-Albanian Border. Princeton, N.J. and Oxford: Princeton University Press. Winner of the Douglass award for best contribution to Europeanist Anthropology 2006 (Society of Europeanist Anthropology, American Anthropological Association). Has been translated into Polish and Greek
- 1997 Urban Amazons: Lesbian Feminism and Beyond in the Gender, Sexuality and Identity Battles of London. London: Macmillan.
- 1997 “The importance of goats to a natural environment: a case study from Epirus (Greece) and Southern Albania” (co-authored with Geoffrey King). Terra Nova 8, pp. 655-658.
