= U.S. Council on Competitiveness =

Council on Competitiveness
- Founded: 1986; 40 years ago
- Founder: John A. Young
- Purpose: Enhancing the United States' economic competitiveness
- Location: 900 17th Street NW, Washington, D.C., United States
- Key people: Samuel R. Allen, Chairman. Deborah L. Wince-Smith, President and CEO.
- Website: www.compete.org

The Council on Competitiveness is an American non-profit organization based in Washington, D.C. The Council’s goal is to increase the United States' economic competitiveness in the global marketplace. The Council also works to bring high-value economic activity into the United States.

The Council works to facilitate the debate on competitiveness by bringing together business, labor, academic and government leaders to evaluate economic challenges and opportunities. This is accomplished through the sponsorship of conferences, seminars, and other special events used to develop new ideas and solutions and to circulate the Council’s findings. The Council makes recommendations that are presented to experts, government officials, media, policy makers, and the general public.

== History ==
The Council on Competitiveness was founded in 1986 by the Chairman of President Ronald Reagan's Commission on Industrial Competitiveness, John A. Young. The current president and CEO of the Council is Deborah L. Wince-Smith. The current chairman is Samuel R. Allen, Chairman & CEO of Deere & Company. The U.S. Council on Competitiveness has had seven chairmen as of 2009.

== Programs ==
Several initiatives are sponsored by the Council. Examples of these include the U.S. Manufacturing Competitiveness Initiative, which seeks to revitalize the U.S. manufacturing sector to boost economic recovery, and the High Performance Computing Initiative, which is intended to propel productivity, innovation and competitiveness through expanding the use of high performance computing throughout the private sector. The Council also prepares and publishes the Competitiveness Index, which tracks performance and competitiveness indicators for the United States and global economies.

== Membership ==
The Council’s membership is an exclusive, invitation only assembly of CEOs of major corporations, university presidents and the heads of national labor organizations. In addition, chief executives of the country’s most prominent nonprofit research organizations, professional societies and trade associations contribute their expertise as national affiliates of the Council. The Council is guided by its volunteer CEO leadership, which determines the annual policy action agenda together with Council staff.

== Board of leadership ==
- Dr. Mehmood Khan, Chairman designate, Vice Chairman & Chief Scientific Officer, PepsiCo
- Brian T. Moynihan, Industry Vice-chair designate, Chairman and CEO, Bank of America
- Michael M. Crow, University Vice-chair, President, Arizona State University
- Lonnie R. Stephenson, Labor Vice-chair designate, President, International Brotherhood of Electrical Workers
- Deborah L. Wince-Smith, President & CEO, Council on Competitiveness
- Samuel R. Allen, Chairman Emeritus, Chairman & CEO, Deere & Company
