= Study abroad organization =

Study abroad organizations, also referred to as study abroad providers, and third-party study abroad providers are independent organizations that facilitate or administer study abroad programs. Providers of study abroad vary enormously in terms of organizational structure, program model and type, and services offered to the participants.

Given the tremendous growth in the number of U.S. students studying abroad over the last two decades, the study abroad industry has become more crowded and competitive in recent years. The study abroad business has traditionally been a cottage industry with a hodgepodge of domestic and foreign universities, for-profit and non-profit independent organizations providing thousands of programs in more than 100 countries. Some, like the Danish Institute for Study Abroad, offer their own programs, with their own courses and curricular expectations. Others, like the Institute for the International Education of Students (IES) and The College of Global Studies at Arcadia University, offer some of their own programs, but also are known for acting as intermediaries—offering student services, plus a quality control stamp, for those students enrolling in foreign universities who want more of a cushion than what's available when they directly enroll through international student offices abroad.

According to the Institute of International Education, the majority of U.S. college students studying abroad, about 72 percent, participate on programs sponsored by their home institution. However, at least 28 percent of the approximately 260,000 Americans who studied abroad in academic year 2008/09 study through an outside program.

== Overview ==
Outside providers like IES and The College of Global Studies at Arcadia University act as intermediaries by assisting program participants with logistics like course registration and housing arrangements. While models differ, academic and social guidance is generally included throughout the duration of a program, such as orientation, support services, field trips and cultural activities. Additionally, providers are typically able to provide transcripts that ease credit transfer for students who enroll in their programs based at universities abroad – offer all these extra services, of course, at an extra cost. Independent providers, like Help Me Abroad, offer solutions to adapt to international students’ requests. They act as intermediaries and allow a wider choice for students who can pick the state, university and program to attend instead of applying to premade programs.

== Relationship with U.S. universities ==
At many campuses, study abroad programs are run by multiple companies and non-profit institutes that offer colleges generous incentives to increase enrollments. An influential article that appeared in The New York Times in 2007 highlighted that this can include free and subsidized travel overseas for officials, back-office services to defray operating expenses, stipends to market the programs to students, unpaid membership on advisory councils and boards, and even cash bonuses and commissions on student-paid fees. This money generally goes directly to colleges, not always to the students who take the trips.

Critics say that these and similar arrangements, which are seldom disclosed, typically limit student options and drive up prices for gaining international credentials compared with the most economical alternative — enrolling directly in a foreign university, paying generally lower tuition to that institution and having the credits transferred. Some campuses require students to use one of several affiliated providers, but some even have exclusive arrangements with study abroad agents, further limiting options.

== See also ==
- Student exchange program
