= Deborah L. Wince-Smith =

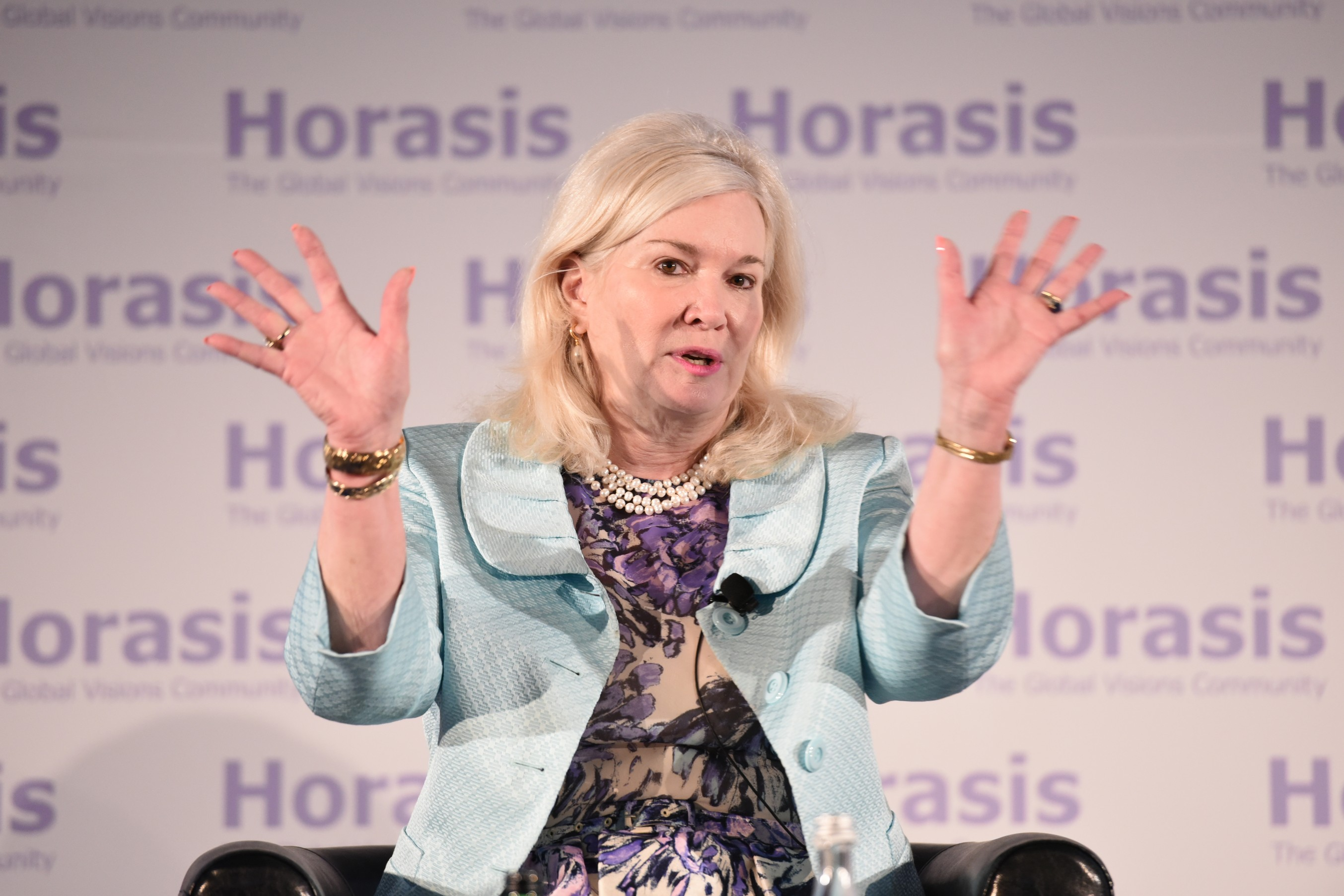
- Wince-Smith speaking at the Horasis Global Meeting; Portuguese Riviera, 2017.

President of the Council on Competitiveness
- In office 2001–present
- Preceded by: John Yochelson

Personal details
- Born: Deborah L. Wince
- Spouse: Michael B. Smith
- Children: 2
- Education: Cambridge University; Vassar College.

Deborah L. Wince-Smith is the president and CEO of the United States Council on Competitiveness since 2001 and the president of the Global Federation of Competitiveness Councils. She previously held several positions in the United States government, including the assistant secretary of commerce for technology policy in the George H. W. Bush administration and the assistant director for international affairs in the Ronald Reagan administration.

== Early life and education ==
Wince-Smith grew up in Akron, Ohio, and earned a degree in classical archaeology. She graduated magna cum laude and Phi Beta Kappa from Vassar College. She earned her master's degree in classical archaeology King’s College, University of Cambridge.

== Professional career ==
Wince-Smith began her career as a program director for the National Science Foundation in 1976–1984 where she managed U.S. research programs with Eastern European countries and U.S. universities.

Wince-Smith is the president and CEO of the Council on Competitiveness, a non-partisan leadership coalition of CEO’s, University Presidents, Labor Union Leaders, and National Laboratory Directors, which are all committed to developing policy solutions and national initiatives to drive future productivity growth, prosperity for all Americans, and the global success of American businesses.

Wince-Smith assumed the leadership role of the Council on Competitiveness after a career as a senior U.S. Government official where served as the Assistant Director for International Affairs in the White House Office of Science and Technology Policy for the Reagan Administration. She was the first Senate-confirmed Assistant Secretary for Technology Policy in the U.S. Department of Commerce in the Administration of President George H.W. Bush, overseeing federal technology transfer policy, implementation of the Bayh–Dole Act, and the White House National Technology Initiative. Wince-Smith was the architect of the landmark 1988 Head of Government Science and Technology Agreement with Japan, and developed ministerial bilateral collaborations with China, India and Latin America. Wince-Smith developed President Reagan’s 1988 Competitiveness Initiative and led the implementation of executive orders and new laws that transformed federal technology transfer policy for U.S. industries, national laboratories and universities. Following her government tenure, Wince-Smith became active in the governance of various national scientific laboratories and provided strategic counsel to several FORTUNE 100 companies.

Wince-Smith spearheaded the National Innovation Initiative (NII) that played a pivotal role in shaping the 2006 Bipartisan National Competes Act. Ms. Wince-Smith helped catalyze a national “innovation movement” launching regional and state innovation initiatives and stimulating a new global focus on competitiveness strategy and policies to optimize innovation-based growth, the production of high value goods, global experts, and skilled job creation. Wince-Smith leads the Council’s Energy and Advanced Manufacturing Initiatives to accelerate energy innovation and advanced manufacturing as twin pillars of U.S. productivity growth, skilled job creation, and global exports.

The Council’s Energy and Manufacturing Initiative and Technology Leadership Forum of Chief Technology Officers, jointly developed the Council’s “National Commission on Innovation and Competitiveness Frontiers.” The Commissioners stated mission is to focus on emerging challenges and opportunities and develop a policy roadmap to jumpstart flagging productivity, respond to new global competitors and address the impacts of ever accelerating technology driven transformation.

Since 2009, Ms. Wince-Smith has served as president and founder of the Global Federation of Competitiveness Councils (GFCC), engaging leaders from over thirty competitiveness organizations from around the globe. The GFCC is the first global network devoted exclusively to the exchange of knowledge and practice related to competitiveness policies and strategies; and, it is the first international, public-private mechanism to promote global economic growth through collaboration in innovation.

Ms. Wince-Smith is a member of corporate and non-profit boards of directors, advisory committees, and philanthropic organizations. She previously served on the Smithsonian National Board, the secretary of State’s Committee on International Economic Policy, the U.S. Naval Academy Foundation and the board of governors of Argonne National Laboratory. She served as chairman of the World Economic Forum’s Global Agenda Council on Competitiveness, as a public director of NASDAQ-OMX from 2005 – 2012, and as a Senate-confirmed member of the oversight board of the Internal Revenue Service from 2006 – 2012.

Ms. Wince-Smith serves as a member of the scientific advisory committee of Lawrence Livermore National Laboratory. She previously served on the University of California President’s Council overseeing Los Alamos, Lawrence Berkeley and, Lawrence Livermore National Laboratories. She served two terms of service on the University of Chicago’s board of governors for Argonne National Laboratory, and as a trustee of Lehigh University. On behalf of former secretary of commerce, Carlos Gutierrez, she chaired the Secretary’s National Advisory Committee on Strengthening America’s Communities producing the first comprehensive assessment of U.S. Government Economic Development Strategy and Program.

Ms. Wince-Smith currently serves on the advisory committee of the Export-Import Bank of the United States (EXIM) and UNICEF. She also serves as a commissioner on the Commission on the Theft of American Intellectual Property, as a member of Purdue University’s Strategic Research Advisory Council (SRAC), and as a member of the council of Japan’s Science and Technology in Society (STS) Forum. She serves as a member of Marquette University’s external advisory board for corporate engagement, as a member of the Queen’s University international advisory committee for the Management School, as a member of UNICEF’s advisory group, as a member of the advisory board of the Delphi Economic Forum, and as an independent advisor to Delos Living, LLC. She also serves on the board of directors of the Mycenaean Foundation, and as a trustee of the American College of Greece (ACG). As an expert in technology commercialization, Ms. Wince-Smith serves on the board of directors of Aerolase, Inc., NanoMech, Inc., and Q-Net Security, Inc.

Ms. Wince-Smith graduated magna cum laude and Phi Beta Kappa from Vassar College and earned a master’s degree in classical archaeology from King’s College, Cambridge University. She received an honorary doctorate in humanities from Michigan State University, an honorary Doctorate of Public Administration from the University of Toledo, an honorary Doctorate of Law honoris causa from the Queens University Belfast, an honorary Doctorate of Humane Letters honoris causa from Worcester Polytechnic Institute and, most recently, an honorary Doctorate of Public Service from the University of South Carolina.

As a new member of The Explorers Club, Ms. Wince-Smith is committed to advancing its mission of global exploration, scientific discovery and protection of the planet.

== Personal life ==
Ms. Wince-Smith was married to the late Deputy United States Trade Representative Ambassador Michael B. Smith and resides in McLean, Virginia. Their two sons are graduates of the U.S. Naval Academy.
