= NAFSA: Association of International Educators =

American organization for teachers

- Abbreviation: NAFSA
- Formation: 1948
- Headquarters: Washington, D.C., United States
- Members: 10,000
- CEO and Executive Director: Fanta Aw, PhD
- Website: nafsa.org
- Formerly called: National Association of Foreign Student Advisers

NAFSA: Association of International Educators is a non-profit professional organization for professionals in all areas of international education including education abroad advising and administration, international student advising, campus internationalization, admissions, outreach, overseas advising, and English as a Second Language (ESL) administration. As of 2010, it served approximately 10,000 educators worldwide, representing nearly 3,000 higher education institutions.

== History ==
NAFSA was founded in 1947 as the National Association of Foreign Student Advisers to help promote the professional development of American college and university officials responsible for assisting and advising the 25,000 foreign students who had come to study in the United States after World War II. Members included academic institutions, government agencies and private organizations. The association's scope soon expanded to include admissions personnel, English-language specialists, and the community volunteers who played an important role in helping foreign students become acclimated to American college communities. To reflect this growing and increasingly diverse membership, in 1964 the association changed its name to the National Association for Foreign Student Affairs.

By 1990, as the number of foreign students in the United States approached the 400,000 mark, there were 6,400 NAFSA members on 1,800 campuses, and increasing numbers of U.S. students were studying abroad. To reflect the now well-established role of NAFSA members in all aspects of international education and exchange, the name of the association was changed once more. In May 1990 the membership formally renamed the organization NAFSA: Association of International Educators, retaining the acronym to reflect NAFSA's proud past and broad name recognition.

== Mission ==
NAFSA's mission, as stated in 2010, is to advance international education and exchange and global workforce development. NAFSA serves international educators and their institutions and organizations by establishing principles of good practice, providing training and professional development opportunities, providing networking opportunities, and advocating for international education.

== Knowledge Communities ==
NAFSA's five Knowledge Communities sponsor 15 professional networks, and one special focus group.

=== Education Abroad ===
The Knowledge Community for Education Abroad (EA) serves professionals who advise U.S. students engaging in study, internship, work, and volunteer opportunities abroad; directors and administrators of such programs; representatives of overseas institutions that accept U.S. students; and faculty and administrators involved in international educational exchange. EA supports three networks and one special focus group: The Education Abroad Knowledge Community Network (EAKC-Network), Center for Capacity Building in Study Abroad Network and the Special Focus Network: Simon Act Initiatives.

=== International Education Leadership ===
This knowledge community addresses the needs of international professionals engaged in visioning, coordinating, and building commitment for internationalization, working at the nexus of administration, faculty, and international education services. Senior international officers, directors of international education, and others in similar positions who lead internationalization efforts on their campuses, or hope to do so in the future, can benefit from subscribing to this network. Two networks support IEL activities: Leading Internationalization Network and International Education Leader Development Network.

=== International Enrollment Management ===
International Enrollment Management (IEM) Knowledge Community (KC) addresses the needs of professionals working in admissions, recruitment, enrollment management, marketing, credential evaluation, intensive English programs, sponsored program agencies, and overseas advising. Five networks support IEM activities: Admissions and Credential Evaluation Network, English Language Training & Administration Network, Marketing and Recruiting Network, Overseas Educational Advising Network and Sponsored Program Administration Network.

=== International Student and Scholar Services ===
This knowledge community provides professional development opportunities for international student and scholar advisers and for those who work or volunteer in campus-and community-based international programming. Three networks support ISSS activities: International Student Advising Network, International Scholar Advising Network, Campus and Community Programming Network.

=== Teaching, Learning and Scholarship ===
The Teaching, Learning, and Scholarship knowledge community (TLS) fosters connections among scholarship, policy, and practice in international education. Three networks support TLS activities: Research and Scholarship Network, Intercultural Communication & Training Network and Internationalizing Teaching, Learning, and Curriculum.

== Regions ==
The NAFSA U.S. membership is divided into 11 geographic regions. Regional leadership teams organize conferences, state meetings and workshops for member states. The 11 NAFSA regions are as follows:

Region	Membership states
I	Washington, Oregon, Idaho, Alaska
II	Montana, Wyoming, Utah, Colorado, Nebraska, Kansas, New Mexico, Arizona
III	Texas, Oklahoma, Arkansas, Louisiana
IV	North Dakota, South Dakota, Minnesota, Iowa, Missouri
V	Wisconsin, Illinois, Michigan
VI	Indiana, Ohio, Kentucky
VII	Tennessee, North Carolina, South Carolina, Georgia, Florida, Alabama, Mississippi, Puerto Rico, U.S. Virgin Islands
VIII	Virginia, West Virginia, Pennsylvania, Delaware, Maryland, Washington DC
X	New York, New Jersey
XI	Vermont, New Hampshire, Maine, Massachusetts, Rhode Island, Connecticut
XII	California, Hawaii, Nevada, & Pacific Islands
