= Pay =

Pay or PAY may refer to:

- Remuneration earned for work, whether by cash or paycheck, wage or salary
- The process of payment

== Places ==
- Pay-e Borj, a village in Lorestan Province of Iran
- Pay-e Kal-e Garab, a village in Ilam Province of Iran
- Pay-e Rah, a village in Khuzestan Province of Iran
- Pay Lake, a lake in Minnesota, USA

== Other ==
- Pay (geology), the portion of a reservoir that contains economically recoverable hydrocarbons
- Partido Alianza por Yucatán, a political party in Mexico
- The Hebrew letter Pe
- Verifone (NYSE stock ticker: PAY)

== People with the surname Pay ==
- Antony Pay (born 1945), English clarinettist
- Dean Pay (born 1969), Australian rugby league footballer
- E. J. Pay (died 1931), British labour movement activist
- Jill Pay (born 1951), Serjeant at Arms, House of Commons, UK
- Kevin Pay (1939–2020), Australian rules footballer
- Pay Chen (born 1976), Canadian television host

== See also ==
- Pay as you go (disambiguation)
- Pay Day (disambiguation)
- Pay It (disambiguation)
- Pay it forward (disambiguation)
- Pay Less (disambiguation)
- Payback (disambiguation)
- Paye (disambiguation)
- Pey (disambiguation)
