= Paye =

Paye or PAYE may refer to:

- Paye (surname)
- Pay As You Earn, a US student loan scheme
- Pay-as-you-earn tax, taxes deducted from each paycheck
- Battle of Paye (1899), Philippines

== See also ==
- Pay (disambiguation)
- PAYG (disambiguation)
