= Medical school in the United States =

Medical school in the United States is a graduate program with the purpose of educating physicians in the undifferentiated field of medicine. Such schools provide a major part of the medical education in the United States. Most medical schools in the U.S. confer upon graduates a Doctor of Medicine (M.D.) degree, while some confer a Doctor of Osteopathic Medicine (D.O.) degree. Most schools follow a similar pattern of education, with two years of classroom and laboratory-based education, followed by two years of clinical rotations in a teaching hospital where students see patients in a variety of specialties. After completion, graduates must complete a residency before becoming licensed to practice medicine.

Admission to medical school in the United States is generally considered highly competitive, although there is a wide range of competitiveness among different types of schools. In 2021, approximately 36% of those who applied to M.D.-granting U.S. medical schools gained admission to any school. Admissions criteria include grade point averages, Medical College Admission Test scores, letters of recommendation, and interviews. Most students have at least a bachelor's degree, usually in a biological science, and some students have advanced degrees, such as a master's degree. Medical school in the United States does not require a degree in biological sciences, but rather a set of undergraduate courses in scientific disciplines thought to adequately prepare students.

The Flexner Report, published in 1910, had a significant effect on reforming medical education in the United States. The report led to the implementation of more structured standards and regulations in medical education. Currently, all medical schools in the United States must be accredited by a certain body, depending on whether it is a D.O.-granting medical school or an M.D.-granting medical school. The Liaison Committee on Medical Education (LCME) is an accrediting body for educational programs at schools of medicine in the United States and Canada. The LCME accredits only the schools that grant an M.D. degree; osteopathic medical schools that grant the D.O. degree are accredited by the Commission on Osteopathic College Accreditation of the American Osteopathic Association. The LCME is sponsored by the Association of American Medical Colleges and the American Medical Association.

== History ==
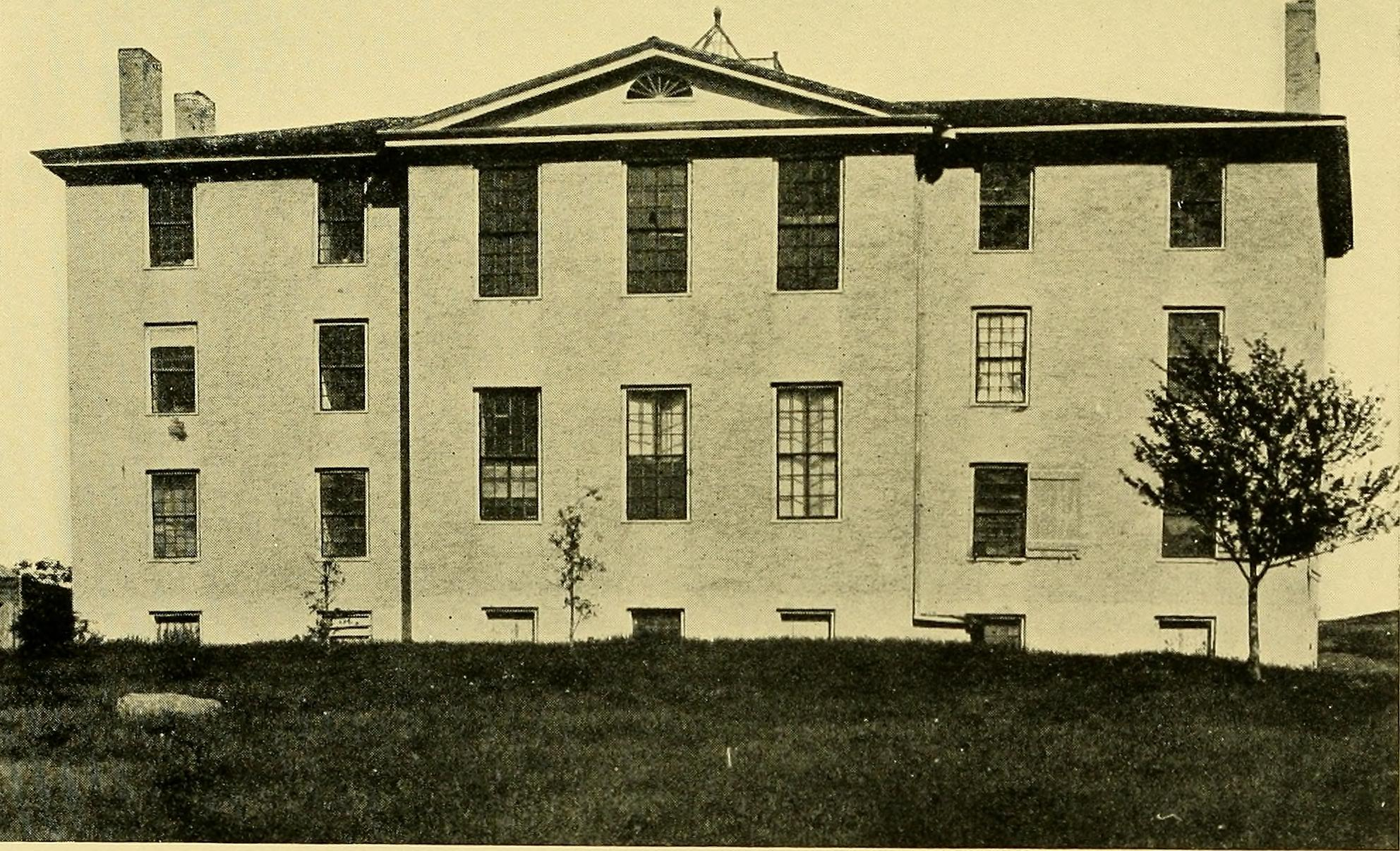
In 1811, Dartmouth constructed the first building in the United States devoted solely to medical education.

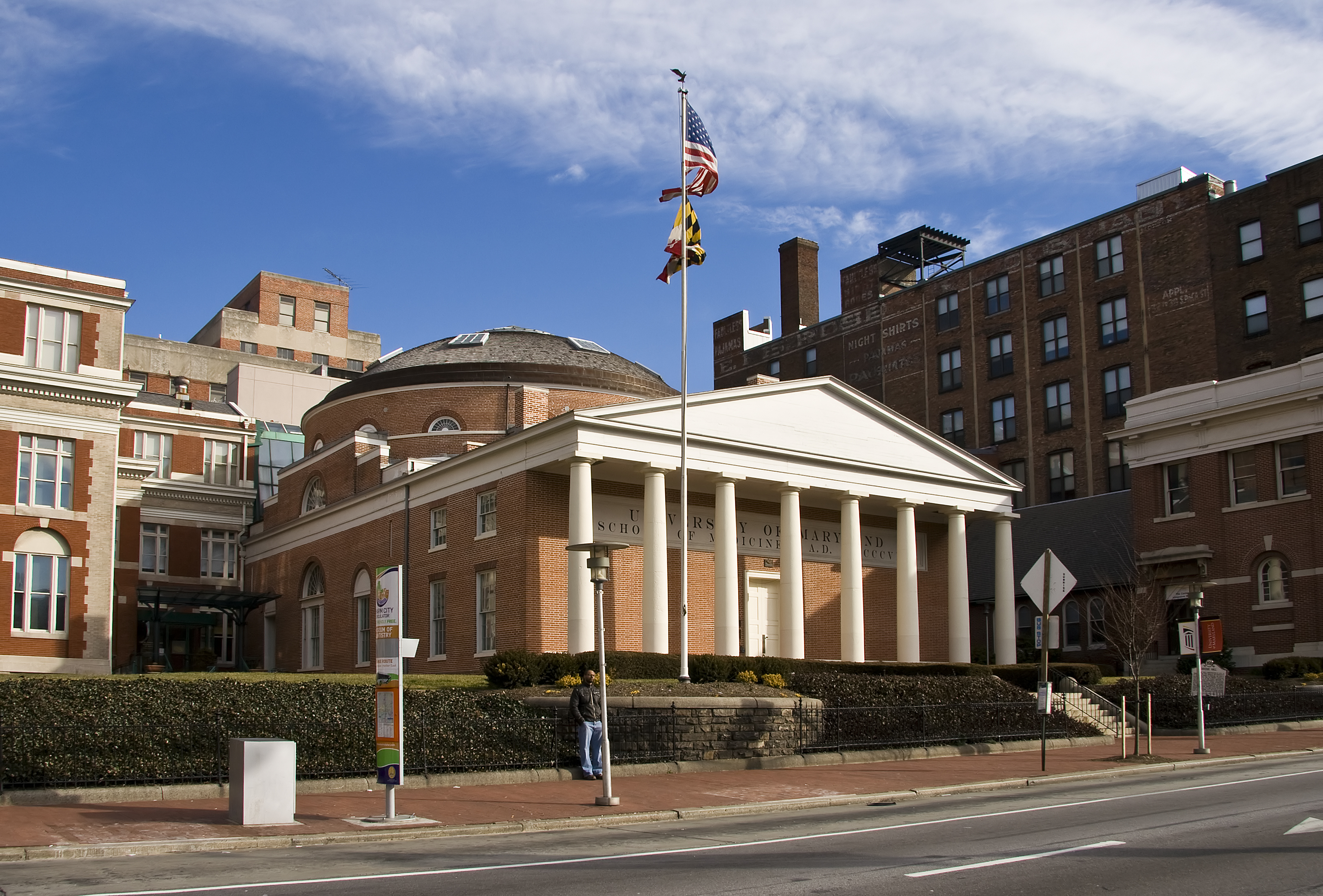
Davidge Hall in Baltimore is the oldest surviving medical school building in the United States. It has been in continuous use for medical education since 1813, housing the University of Maryland School of Medicine (1807), the first public medical school in the United States.

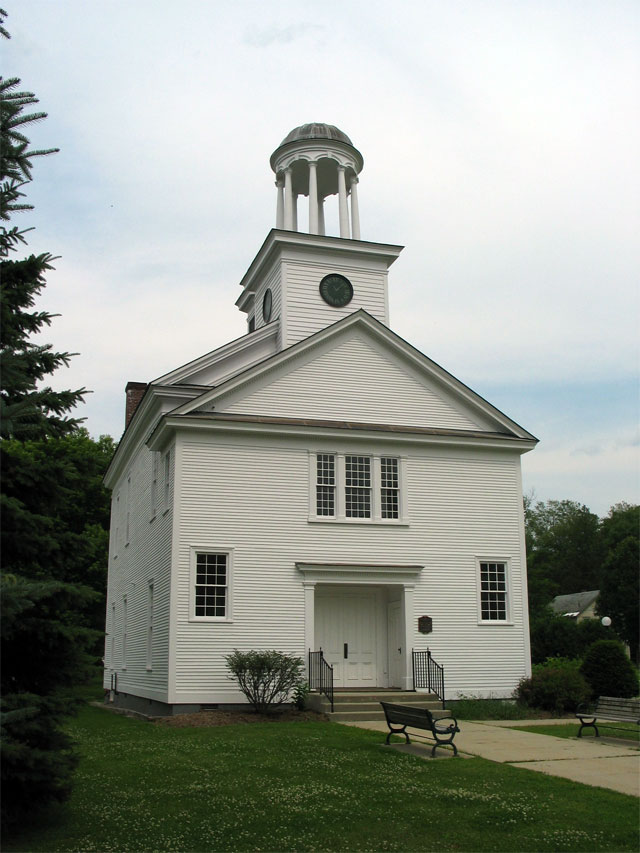
Castleton Medical College, (1821) in Vermont, is the oldest surviving medical school building in New England.

Many of the early medical schools in the United States were founded by alumni of the University of Edinburgh Medical School, the oldest medical school in the United Kingdom and one of the oldest medical schools in the English-speaking world. A majority of these schools were established within Northeast colleges that today make up the Ivy League, and modeled after their founders' coursework at Edinburgh. The nation's first medical school opened in 1765 at the College of Philadelphia by John Morgan and William Shippen Jr.; this school developed over time into the University of Pennsylvania's Perelman School of Medicine. At the College of Philadelphia, the first ten physicians in the United States graduated in June 1768 with the Bachelor of Medicine degree. In 1767, Dr. Samuel Bard, an alumnus of then-King's College, opened a short-lived medical school that ultimately was forced to close in 1776 at the onset of the American Revolution. The school reopened in 1784 and, after a period of struggle, merged with the New York College of Physicians and Surgeons to become Columbia University's Vagelos College of Physicians and Surgeons in 1814. By the turn of the 19th century, four medical schools had been established in the United States, with Harvard Medical School opening in 1782, followed by Dartmouth Medical School in 1797. Dartmouth, founded by Nathan Smith, was the first medical school established outside of a major US city, and the first medical school founded in the independent United States after the end of the revolutionary war. Smith went on to also establish three other New England medical schools: the Medical Institution of Yale College (1810), the now-defunct Medical School of Maine (1821), and the University of Vermont College of Medicine (1822). Brown University continued the growth of New England medical schools by establishing the Brown School of Medicine (1811). The first public medical school in the United States, the University of Maryland School of Medicine, was founded in 1807 as the College of Medicine of Maryland and became the founding school of the University System of Maryland.

As medical colleges began to proliferate across the young nation in the 19th century, the American Medical Association was formed in 1847. Almost thirty years later in 1876, the Association of American Medical Colleges was established to develop a set of standards for the education provided at US medical schools.

In 1910, the Flexner Report reported on the state of medical education in the United States and Canada. Written by Abraham Flexner and published in 1910 under the aegis of the Carnegie Foundation for the Advancement of Teaching, the report set standards and reformed American medical education. This report led to the demise of many non-university based medical schools.

After World War I, the standard practice of completing an internship after medical school became a commonplace requirement to practice medicine, and a list of approved hospitals for the training of interns was complied. In 1928, the AMA published a set of guidelines for residencies.

In 1940, the Report of the Commission on Graduate Medical Education was published, which first described the overworking of interns and residents. The Liaison Committee on Medical Education was established in 1942.

Combination programs granting a bachelor's degree and medical degree are relatively rare in the US. Baccalaureate-MD programs opened for the first time in 1961 at Northwestern University Medical School and Boston University School of Medicine. By the 1990s, 34 programs had opened, and in 2011, these programs were offered at 57 medical schools. Several of these schools offer programs in combination with more than one undergraduate institution, for a total of 81 programs. In all current combination programs admitting graduating high school students to receive both a bachelors and a medical degree, the medical education portion is four years in length. 80% of the programs are 8 years in length, giving no time advantage to students over the standard process, but 21% offer a compressed 6- or 7-year program. This is different from the programs of the 1990s, where 42% of programs were 8 years, 32% were 7 years, and 23% were 6 years.

For years following the Flexner report, medical education in the United States has followed a standardized pattern, with two years of classroom education, followed by two years of clinical experience. Since the early 2010s, the idea of shortening medical school to three years once again has been raised as a solution to the massive debt facing medical graduates and the growing shortage of physicians in primary care specialties. A small number of universities are experimenting with three-year programs. New York University offers a 3-year program with an early acceptance into a residency program for students that wish to apply for a specific specialty before beginning their medical education. A handful of universities, including the Penn State College of Medicine, University of California Davis School of Medicine, and Texas Tech University Health Sciences Center School of Medicine, offer these programs for students that commit to entering a family medicine residency.

== Admissions ==
In general, admission into a U.S. medical school is considered highly competitive and typically requires completion of a four-year bachelor's degree or at least 90 credit hours from an accredited college or university. Many applicants obtain further education before medical school in the form of master's degrees or other non-science-related degrees. Admissions criteria may include overall performance in the undergraduate years and performance in a group of courses specifically required by U.S. medical schools (pre-health sciences), the score on the Medical College Admission Test (MCAT), application essays, letters of recommendation (most schools require either one letter from the undergraduate institution's premedical advising committee or a combination of letters from at least one member of the science faculty and one non-science faculty member), and interviews.

Beyond objective admissions criteria, many programs look for candidates who have had unique experiences in community service, volunteer work, international studies, research, or other advanced degrees. The application essay is the primary opportunity for the candidate to describe their reasons for entering a medical career. The essay requirements are usually open-ended to allow creativity and flexibility for the candidate to draw upon their personal experiences and challenges to stand out amongst other applicants. If granted, an interview serves as an additional way to express these subjective strengths.

Since 2005, the Association of American Medical Colleges has recommended that all medical schools conduct background checks on applicants in order to prevent individuals with convictions for serious crimes from being matriculated.

Most commonly, the bachelor's degree is in one of the biological sciences, but not always; in 2020, nearly 40% of medical school matriculates had received bachelor's degrees in fields other than biology or specialized health sciences. All medical school applicants must, however, complete undergraduate courses with labs in biology, general chemistry, organic chemistry, and physics; some medical schools have additional requirements such as biochemistry, calculus, genetics, psychology and English. Many of these courses have prerequisites, so there are other "hidden" course requirements (basic science courses) that are often taken first. Concerns have been raised that these stringent science requirements constrict the applicant pool and deter many potentially talented future physicians, including those from groups historically underrepresented in medicine, from applying.

A student with a bachelor's degree who has not taken the pre-medical coursework may complete a post-baccalaureate (postbacc) program. Such programs allow rapid fulfillment of prerequisite course work as well as grade point average improvement. Some postbacc programs are specifically linked to individual medical schools to allow matriculation without a gap year, while most require 1–2 years to complete. Post-bacc programs have become popular among applicants to medical school. The New York Times reported that in 2011, more than 15 percent of new medical students had gone through such a program. Studies have shown that graduates of post-baccalaureate programs were more likely to be providing care in federally designated underserved areas or to vulnerable populations.

Several universities across the U.S. admit college students to their medical schools during college; students attend a single six-year to eight-year integrated program consisting of two to four years of an undergraduate curriculum and four years of medical school curriculum, culminating in both a bachelor's and M.D. degree or a bachelor's and D.O. degree. Some of these programs admit high school students to college and medical school.

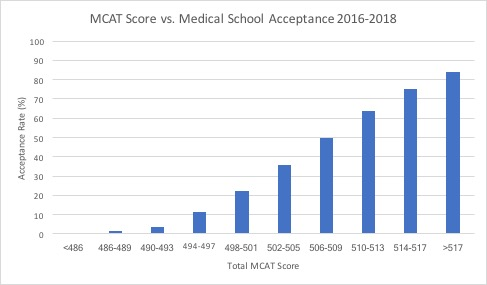
Medical School Acceptance based on MCAT Scores, 2016-2018

While not necessary for admission, several private organizations have capitalized on this complex and involved process by offering services ranging from single-component preparation (such as the MCAT or the essay) to reviewing and providing consultation regarding the entire application.

In 2023, the average MCAT and GPA for students entering U.S.-based M.D. programs were 511.7 (approximately 82nd percentile) and 3.77 respectively, and (as of 2018) 504 and 3.54 for D.O. matriculants.

In 2023–2024, 52,577 people applied to M.D.-granting medical schools in the United States through the American Medical College Application Service. Of these 52,577 students, 22,981 of them matriculated into a medical school for a success rate of 43.7 percent. However, this figure does not account for the attrition rate of pre-med students in various stages of the pre-application process (those who ultimately decide not to apply due to weeding out by low GPA, low MCAT, lack of clinical and research experience, and numerous other factors).

== Curriculum ==
Medical school typically consists of four years of education and training, although a few programs offer three-year tracks. Traditionally, the first two years consist of basic science and clinical medicine courses, such as anatomy, biochemistry, histology, microbiology, pharmacology, physiology, cardiology, pulmonology, gastroenterology, endocrinology, psychiatry, and neurology. D.O. students also study osteopathic manipulative medicine. USMLE Step 1/COMLEX Level 1 of the medical licensing boards are taken at the completion of the preclinical phase of study.

Traditionally medical schools have divided the first year into the basic science courses and the second year into clinical science courses, but it has been increasingly common since the mid-2000s for schools to follow a "systems-based" curriculum, in which students take shorter courses that focus on one organ or functional system at a time, and relevant topics such as pharmacology are integrated.

The third and fourth years consist of clinical rotations, sometimes called clerkships, during which students see patients in hospitals and clinics. These rotations are usually at teaching hospitals but are occasionally at community hospitals or with private physicians. Mandatory rotations in the third year are often obstetrics and gynecology, pediatrics, psychiatry, family medicine, internal medicine, and surgery. During the third year, medical students take Step 2/Level 2 of the medical licensing boards. Fourth-year rotations typically allow students to choose several electives and finish required rotations. It is also used as a period of auditioning for residency programs.

Typical weeks of instruction for some of these clinical rotations are shown below.

Clerkship and weeks of instruction
Clerkship	Weeks of instruction (mode)
Family medicine	4
Internal medicine	8
Neurology	4
Obstetrics and gynecology	6
Pediatrics	6
Psychiatry	6
Surgery	8
Surgical specialties	4

=== Dual-degree programs ===
Many medical schools also offer joint degree programs in which some medical students may simultaneously enroll in master's or doctoral-level programs in related fields such as a Masters in Business Administration, Masters in Healthcare Administration, Masters in Public Health, JD, Master of Arts in Law and Diplomacy, and Masters in Health Communication. Some schools, such as the Wayne State University School of Medicine and the Medical College of South Carolina, both offer an integrated basic radiology curriculum during their respective M.D. programs led by investigators of the Advanced Diagnostic Ultrasound in Microgravity study.

Upon completion of medical school, the student gains the title of doctor and the degree of M.D. or D.O. but cannot practice independently until completing at least an internship and also Step 3 of the USMLE (for M.D.) or COMLEX Level 3 (for D.O.). Doctors of medicine and doctors of osteopathic medicine have an equal scope of practice in the United States, with some osteopathic physicians supplementing their practice with principles of osteopathic medicine.

=== Grading ===
Medical schools use a variety of different grading methods. Even within one school, the grading of the basic sciences and clinical clerkships may vary. Most medical schools use the pass/fail schema rather than letter grades; however, the range of grading intervals varies. In addition, sometimes it is important to evaluate the overall sense of how collaborative a student body is instead of basing judgment solely on grading intervals (in other words, a school with honors can still be very collaborative, while some schools with pass/fail grading can be very competitive and individualistic). The following are examples of grades used with different intervals:

- 2 intervals = Pass/fail
- 3 intervals = Honors/pass/fail
- 4 intervals = Honors/high pass/pass/fail (or ABCF)
- 5 intervals = Honors/high pass/pass/low pass/fail (or ABCDF)

A 2019 survey showed that most schools use a pass/fail system for pre-clerkship courses and the honors/high pass/pass/fail system for clinical clerkships.

At some schools, a Medical Student Performance Evaluation, also called a dean's letter, more specifically describes the performance of a student during medical school.

== Student profile ==
The percentage of female medical students has been consistently growing within the last few decades, as shown by the survey data below:

First-year medical students by gender (1999-2019)
Year	Schools surveyed	Male 1st year	Female 1st year	Male total	Female total
1999-2000	125	9131	7725	37336	28164
2000-2001	125	9074	7739	36719	29576
2001-2002	125	8845	8088	35959	30260
2002-2003	126	8709	8410	35378	31300
2003-2004	126	8590	8528	35020	32146
2004-2005	125	8646	8463	34575	32721
2005-2006	125	8952	8483	34835	33445
2006-2007	125	9164	8716	35370	33658
2007-2008	126	9446	8926	36194	34155
2008-2009	126	9619	8889	37040	34538
2009-2010	130	9787	9099	38022	35060
2010-2011	131	10146	9006	38908	35486
2011-2012	134	10404	9315	39845	36066
2012-2013	136	10722	9326	40880	36556
2013-2014	140	10846	9737	41749	37196
2014-2015	141	10859	10019	42529	38226
2015-2016	142	10997	10131	43085	38658
2016-2017	145	10756	10640	43051	40041
2017-2018	147	10752	11054	43263	41359
2018-2019	151	10634	11382	43124	42920

== Social and personal effects of medical school ==
Various studies have shown that American medical students have depression rates that are higher than the general population Some of the factors that have been mentioned as possible causes include financial pressures, academic competition, exposure to human suffering, and bullying.

In recent years, reports of suicide in unmatched residency applicants have drawn attention to medical student and physician suicide. For those who have developed good exercise habits, continuing to do so may not be difficult. However, for students who have not yet developed the habit, they may find their physical well-being exacerbated by their new stressful lifestyle. Maintaining long-term relationships is also often a challenge.

== Accreditation ==
All medical schools within the United States must be accredited by one of two organizations. The Liaison Committee on Medical Education (LCME), jointly administered by the Association of American Medical Colleges and the American Medical Association, accredits M.D. schools, while the Commission on Osteopathic College Accreditation of the American Osteopathic Association accredits osteopathic (D.O.) medical schools. There are presently 154 M.D. programs and 38 D.O. programs in the United States.

Accreditation is required for a school's students to receive federal loans. Additionally, schools must be accredited to receive federal funding for medical education. The M.D. and D.O. are the only medical degrees offered in the United States which are listed in the WHO/IMED list of medical schools.

== Finances ==
The median four-year cost of medical school (including expenses and books) was $278,455 for private medical schools, and $207,866 for public schools in 2013 according to the Association of American Medical Colleges. This does not include the opportunity cost of attending school. A large portion (over 70%) of medical students finance their education with loans. As of 2019, the median education debt for medical school graduates was approximately $200,000.

The rising cost of medical education has caused concern. In 1986, the mean debt accumulated in medical school was $32,000, which is approximately $70,000 in 2017 dollars. In 2016, the mean medical school debt was $190,000. However, in 2016, 27% of medical students graduated with no debt. This is a large increase from 2010, when 16% of students had no debt upon graduation. According to the Journal of the American Medical Association, scholarship funds among those graduating without debt dropped by more than half, from $135,186 in 2010 to $52,718 in 2016. This suggests that the increase in students graduating without debt is due to personal wealth rather than decreased cost of attending medical school. Additionally, with an increase in total debt and a decrease in the number of students carrying debt, the debt accumulated by medical students is increasingly being concentrated in fewer students with larger debt loads.

A current economic theory suggests that increasing borrowing limits may have been the cause of the increased tuition. As medical students are allowed to borrow more, medical schools raise tuition prices to maximally increase revenue. A study by the Cato Institute shows that schools raise prices 97 cents for each one-dollar increase in borrowing capacity.

There is no consensus on whether the level of debt carried by medical students has a strong effect on their choice of medical specialty. Dr. Herbert Pardes and others have suggested that medical school debt has been a direct cause of the U.S. primary-care shortage. However, the amount of debt carried by medical graduates suggests the opposite. Students in more competitive specialties had significantly less debt on graduation, meaning that they were not reliant on higher future compensation to repay loans. In 2016, 80% of family medicine residents graduated with debt, while only 74% of anesthesiology residents and 60% of ophthalmology residents graduated with any debt. The mean debt of students that did have debt entering family medicine residencies was $181,000, while the mean debt of those entering dermatology residencies was $153,000.

In February 2010, The Wall Street Journal published a story of Dr. Michelle Bisutti's $555,000 medical school debt. The large amount of debt is a direct result of Bisutti deferring her student debt payment during her residency.

=== Indebtedness relief programs ===
Income-based repayment (IBR) and Pay as You Earn (PAYE) give options to lower monthly repayments based on adjusted gross income (AGI) for all federal student loans. Physicians in public service are also eligible for student loan forgiveness after ten years of loan payment while in a public service job.

Repayment options that lower monthly payments and student loan forgiveness (PSLF) in public service are advised to medical residents slated to earn much higher salaries after residency. Among 2019 graduates, 34% reported planning to pursue PSLF and 56% reported no plans to enter a loan forgiveness program.

=== Exceptions ===
- Exceptions to free with over $20,000/yr stipend (MSTP, military scholarship). Uniformed Services University of the Health Sciences has an age requirement of "no older than 36 as of June 30 in the year of matriculation."
- In 2018, New York University School of Medicine announced that all current and new students would receive full-tuition scholarship.
- In 2019, Washington University School of Medicine announced that more than half of students would receive full-tuition scholarships.
- In 2023, Albert Einstein College of Medicine announced that all current and new students would receive full-tuition scholarships.

== See also ==
- African American student access to medical schools
- History of public health in the United States
- List of medical schools in the United States
