= Paid =

Paid or PAID may refer to:

- Paid (1930 film), an American film starring Joan Crawford
- Paid (2006 film), a Dutch film
- Personality and Individual Differences, a journal
- "Paid", a song by ¥$ from the album Vultures 1

== See also ==
- Paide, the capital of Järva County, Estonia
- Pay (disambiguation)
