= Income-driven repayment =

Student loan repayment program

Income-driven repayment (IDR) is an umbrella term for student loan repayment programs in the United States in which the amount a borrower is required to pay is adjusted based on the borrower's income and, in some programs, other factors such as family size.

Several different versions of IDR have been available within the William D. Ford Federal Direct Loan Program (FDLP, FDSLP, Direct Loan) and the now-defunct Federal Family Education Loan Program (FFEL). They include:

- Income-Based Repayment (IBR)
- Pay As You Earn (PAYE)
- Saving on a Valuable Education (SAVE), which automatically replaced Revised Pay As You Earn (REPAYE) in 2023 In 2024, the SAVE program was frozen, pending lawsuits.
- Income-Contingent Repayment (ICR)
- Repayment Assistance Plan (RAP), enacted in 2025 as part of the One Big Beautiful Bill Act.

== History ==
Income-contingent repayment of student loans has been formally proposed in the United States, in various forms, since 1971. The concept has been championed by politicians from both the right and the left.

The first iteration, Income-Contingent Repayment (ICR) plan, was signed in 1993 under President Bill Clinton, and was introduced in July 1994. The general trend in plans since have offered more favorable terms for borrowers (see Table 1-1 at: https://www.cbo.gov/publication/56277#_idTextAnchor008).

On June 9, 2014, President Obama announced that the Department of Education would modify the PAYE Plan so that it is available to all borrowers, regardless of when they borrowed. The new repayment plan, Revised Pay As You Earn (REPAYE), launched on December 17, 2015.

Using constant 2025 dollars and Federal Poverty Level figures, a single person with a $50,000 adjusted gross income (AGI) would generally pay:

- $572.50 a month under Clinton's 1993 ICR plan
- $331.56 a month under Bush's 2007 IBR plan
- $221.04 a month under Obama's 2015 REPAYE plan
- $61.62 a month under Biden's SAVE plan for undergrad only, and $123.23 a month for grad school loans only, and a weighted average payment between the two for people with loans for both.

The U.S. Department of Education Office of Inspector General calculated that the portion of total Direct Loan volume being repaid through IDR plans has increased 625 percent from the FY 2011 loan cohort ($7.1 billion) to the FY 2015 loan cohort ($51.5 billion). For IDR plans, the Federal government is expected to lend more money than borrowers repay. From the FY 2011 through FY 2015 loan cohorts, the total positive subsidy cost (net cash outflow) for student loans being repaid through IDR plans has increased 748%, from $1.4 billion to $11.5 billion.

President Biden's final round of student debt relief on January 16, 2025 has approved a total of $189 billion in loan cancellation for 5.3 million borrowers — more than any other president.

- $78.5 billion in forgiveness for more than 1 million borrowers through Public Service Loan Forgiveness (just 7,000 borrowers had been approved before Biden, with a rejection rate of 99% under Trump/DeVos).
- $5.5 billion for 414,000 borrowers enrolled in the SAVE plan.
- $57.1 billion through income-driven repayment adjustment for more than 1.45 million borrowers (there were only 50 under Trump/DeVos).
- $34.5 billion for nearly 2 million borrowers whose colleges abruptly closed, were defrauded by their college or are covered by court settlements.
- $18.7 billion for more than 633,000 borrowers who are totally and permanently disabled.

On February 18 2025, the Eighth Circuit blocked the SAVE plan. Following the ruling until March 26 2025 the online applications were temporarily unavailable. Income based repayment was restructured under the One Big Beautiful Bill Act. Efforts to close the department of education have contributed to a backlog of applications. On August 1 2025, interest resumed on those in the SAVE Plan. In July 2025, the Department of Education temporarily suspended forgiveness under IBR which it restarted in October 2025.

== Mechanics ==
Payments under the IBR Plan are 10% or 15% of discretionary income but never exceed the 10-year standard repayment amount.

Whether a borrower pays 10% or 15% of discretionary income depends on when the borrower first started borrowing student loans.

- 10% of the borrower's discretionary income if they borrowed on or after July 1, 2014
- 15% of the borrower's discretionary income if they did not borrow on or after July 1, 2014

Payments under the PAYE Plan are 10% of discretionary income but will never be more than the 10-year standard repayment amount.

Payments under the (abolished) REPAYE Plan were also 10% of discretionary income; however, unlike IBR and PAYE, payments for high-income borrowers may have been higher than the 10-year standard repayment amount. Also, unlike IBR and PAYE, if required monthly payments did not cover the accruing interest, 50% of the unpaid interest was forgiven, thereby reducing negative amortization.

Payments under the ICR Plan are the lesser of 20% of discretionary income or a 12-year standard repayment amount adjusted based on the borrower's income.

Under the SAVE plan, payments are modified and forgiveness provisions were proposed:

- Discretionary income is defined as income above 225% of the poverty level (up from 150% in previous plans), which depends on family size.
- Payments for undergraduate loans are capped at 10% of discretionary income. A proposal to lower the cap to 5% is blocked by a preliminary injunction. Combined undergraduate and graduate loan payments are capped at a weighted average between 5% and 10%.
- Interest does not accumulate faster than it can it be paid off, so loans never grow.
- A proposal to forgive loans Loan with a starting balance of $12,000 and after 10 years is blocked by a preliminary injunction. Under the proposal, one year of payments is required for every additional $1000 originally borrowed, up to a cap of 20 years for undergraduate and 25 years for graduate loans.
- Participants in REPAYE were automatically converted, with all past payments counting toward the proposed forgiveness.
- Annual reporting of income can be done automatically if consent is given for the IRS to electronically report adjusted gross income from tax returns.
- Income from a married spouse filing separate income tax returns is no longer counted.

== Eligibility ==
Eligibility requirements for the income-driven repayment plans depend on which plan the borrower chooses and when the student borrowed.

- The ICR Plan has the fewest eligibility requirements. A borrower is only required to have an eligible loan.
- The IBR and Pay As You Earn Plans require that the borrower demonstrate a "need" to make income-driven payments and have eligible loans.
- The Pay As You Earn Plan is limited to those who borrowed recently. Specifically, the borrower must be a "new borrower" as of October 1, 2007, and have received a disbursement of a Direct Loan on or after October 1, 2011. A borrower is a "new borrower" if, when receiving a federal student loan on or after October 1, 2007, the borrower did not have an outstanding balance on another federal student loan.

== Eligible loans ==
Eligible loans for the ICR Plan are all loans made under the William D. Ford Federal Direct Loan Program except Parent PLUS Loans. However, if a Parent PLUS Loan is consolidated into a Direct Consolidation Loan, then the Direct Consolidation Loan may be repaid under the ICR Plan.

Eligible loans for the IBR Plan are all loans made under the Ford Program and Federal Family Education Loan Program except for Parent PLUS Loans. Unlike ICR, Parent PLUS Loans cannot be consolidated into a consolidation loan to qualify.

Eligible loans for the PAYE Plan are all loans made under the Ford Program except for Parent PLUS Loans. Unlike ICR, Parent PLUS Loans cannot be consolidated into a consolidation loan to qualify.

Borrowers with Federal Family Education Loan (FFEL) Program loans and Federal Perkins Loan Program loans may become eligible for the ICR, Pay As You Earn, and Revised Pay As You Earn plans by consolidating them into a Direct Consolidation Loan.

== Different terms and conditions ==
The IBR and PAYE Plans require that borrowers demonstrate a "need" to make income-driven payments. This debt-to-income test checks to see whether the borrower would see a payment amount reduction under the IBR or PAYE Plan relative to the 10-year standard repayment plan.

The IBR Plan has different terms and conditions depending on when the student borrowed. If the borrower is a "new borrower" on or after July 1, 2014, then the borrower will have payments that are generally 10% of discretionary income, and forgiveness is provided for after 20 years of qualifying payment. If a borrower is not a new borrower on or after July 1, 2014, then payments will generally be 15% of discretionary income, and forgiveness is provided for after 25 years of qualifying repayment.

Similar to the definition of "new borrower" for Pay As You Earn, a new borrower for the IBR Plan is one who, when receiving a federal student loan on or after July 1, 2014, the borrower did not have an outstanding balance on another federal student loan.

== Determining eligibility ==
Utilizing the repayment estimator online, a borrower may estimate their other monthly payments under all repayment plans, including IBR. However, repayment estimator can only estimate eligibility. To determine that they are eligible, the borrower must contact their loan servicer. The National Student Loan Data System lets a borrower know who is the servicer of their loan.

== Public Service Loan Forgiveness Program ==
The Public Service Loan Forgiveness Program provides for the forgiveness of certain types of federal student loans after 10 years of qualifying employment and payments. The IBR plan can qualify for the Public Service Loan Forgiveness Program. To receive Public Service Loan Forgiveness, the borrower must repay their loans under one of the "income-driven repayment plans," including IBR.

== Applying for an income-driven repayment plan ==
To apply for an income-driven repayment plan, a borrower needs to submit the Income-Driven Repayment Plan Request and provide information about family size and income.

Tax information, as well as the application itself, and certification of family size, may be provided electronically through StudentLoans.gov. If completing the application electronically, a borrower may transfer tax information into the application directly from the Internal Revenue Service (IRS).

According to the application, borrowers may also self-certify if they currently have no income, thus avoiding needing to try and document that they have no income.

== See also ==
- Human capital contract
- Income-contingent repayment
- Income share agreement
- Repayment plan
- Student loan
