= Human capital contract =

Finance product

A human capital contract (or "HCC") is a finance product that allows for the provision of funds to an individual through an "equity-like" arrangement, where the provider of the funds receives a portion of the individual's future income for some specified period of time. Human capital contracts have been advocated by a number of Nobel Prize–winning economists, including Milton Friedman, Robert Merton, and Gary Becker. Adam Smith in The Wealth of Nations described the knowledge and skills of workers as a form of human capital.

Human capital contracts are characterized by an initial investment amount by the capital provider, followed by a series of periodic dividend payments made from the receiver of the capital to the provider. These payments are variable in amount, proportional with the capital receiver's income, and may never total the initial investment amount made the capital provider. In contrast, a loan is a form of debt, characterized by interest payments based on a fixed principal amount, where the repayment of the principal is a necessary condition of the loan.

In the 1970s, Yale University attempted to replace traditional student loans with human capital contracts under its "Tuition Postponement Option", a program designed by economists Milton Friedman and James Tobin. However, the program was eventually abandoned as a failure. Other attempts to use human capital contracts (or student loans with equity-like payoffs) to fund students, have also generally failed because of severe adverse selection problems—students who opt into such programs are generally those who expect to pursue low-income careers, and are least likely to be able to repay their loans. In addition, human capital contracts, like income taxes, can contribute to moral hazard, by discouraging borrowers from maximizing their income and encouraging them instead to focus on non-wage based forms of compensation, such as more enjoyable work, better benefits, or lighter schedules.

Recently, a number of companies have begun to attempt to commercially underwrite human capital contracts for the first time, including some that are not focused on funding a student population.

Anand Reddi and Andreas Thyssen, of the University of Colorado School of Medicine, proposed the use of human capital contracts to fund U.S. medical education in their article in The Huffington Post entitled "Healthcare Reform: Solving the Medical Student Debt Crisis Through Human Capital Contracts". The Reddi-Thyssen plan is being vetted by the American Medical Association. There are other plans to vet human capital contracts for global health. The mechanism is that an investor will cover the entire cost of a student's medical training. In exchange, the student will work for the first 10 years of their medical career in a government or NGO sponsored health clinic in their respective country of medical education. Their medical license will be contingent on this obligatory national service. Additionally, a multilateral “binding” agreement between the African country and destination countries (such as Australia, Canada, New Zealand, United Kingdom, and the United States)-brokered by the investor- could prevent migration during the term period.

The University of California system is also currently evaluating human capital contracts as a possible solution for providing more affordable, sustainable tuition assistance. There is also a plan to use human capital contracts in global health.

In comparing the merits of human capital contracts with loans, proponents have noted that providers of HCCs are better aligned with the financial interests of the receiver of the funds, and the stream of payments required should be relatively more affordable to individuals who experience adverse economic events such as unemployment or other decreases in disposable income. Relative to conventional consumer loan structures, however, the regulatory framework related to human capital contracts is underdeveloped and has thus far prevented widespread proliferation of the product despite considerable academic research. However work is underway in the UK to combine the benefits of human capital contracts with the legal framework developed for loans under the Consumer Credit Act. It is estimated that this will improve both borrowing costs and returns by lowering the default rate.

== See also ==
- Income-contingent repayment
- Income Share Agreement
