= Pay it forward (disambiguation) =

Pay it forward is an expression for describing the beneficiary of a good deed repaying the deed to others instead of to the original benefactor.

Pay It Forward may also refer to:

- Pay It Forward (financial aid policy), a US model for financing higher education
- Pay It Forward (novel), a 1999 novel by Catherine Ryan Hyde
- Pay It Forward (film), a 2000 film based on the novel
- "Pay It Forward" (Impractical Jokers), a 2011 television episode
- "Pay It Forward", a revenue model by Angel Studios

Paying It Forward may refer to:

- "Paying It Forward", a 2003 short story by Michael A. Burstein
- Paying it Forward, a 2017 GoFundMe campaign centered in Philadelphia, Pennsylvania, ultimately revealed to be a scam

== See also ==
- Pay It (disambiguation)
