= Paye (surname) =

Paye is a surname and may refer to:

Sports

- Aaron Paye (born 1981), American-Liberian football player
- Charlie Paye (1886–1966), Irish Gaelic footballer
- Daniel Paye (born 2000), Liberian footballer
- Djibril Tamsir Paye (born 1990), Guinean footballer
- John Paye (born 1965), American football quarterback
- Kate Paye (born 1974), American basketball coach
- Kwity Paye (born 1998), American football player
- Michael Paye (born 1983), American wheelchair basketball player
- Mick Paye (born 1966), English footballer
- Ndialou Paye (born 1974), Senegalese basketball player
- Pape Paye (born 1990), French footballer

Other

- Harry Paye (died 1419), English privateer and smuggler
- Jean-Claude Paye (born 1952), Belgian sociologist
- Jean-Claude Paye (1934), French diplomat and civil servant
- Lucien Paye (1907–1972), French politician
- Ndella Paye (born c. 1974), Senegal-born French Afro-feminist
- Robert Paye, pseudonym of British author Marjorie Bowen (1885–1952)
- Robin Fraser-Paye, British costume designer
