= Payback =

Payback may refer to:

- Revenge, a harmful action against a person or group in response to a grievance

Payback may also refer to:

== Art, entertainment, and media ==
=== Fictional entities ===
- Payback, a member of the fictional comics superhero team Shadow Cabinet by DC Comics
- Payback, a fictional character in the Marvel Comics series True Believers
- Payback, a fictional team of superheroes from TV series The Boys led by Soldier Boy

=== Film ===
- Payback (1995 film), an American thriller starring C. Thomas Howell
- Payback (1996 film), a short film by Australian director Warwick Thornton
- Payback (1997 film), an American television film starring Mary Tyler Moore
- Payback (1999 film), an American film starring Mel Gibson; a remake of the 1967 film Point Blank starring Lee Marvin
- Payback (2010 film), an Indian Hindi thriller film
- Payback (2012 film), a Canadian documentary film

=== Literature ===
- Payback (novel) (German: Vergeltung), a 1956 novel by Gert Ledig
- "Payback: A Strandville Prequel Short (Max Reid's Story)" (2012), a short story in Belinda Frisch's Strandville zombie novel series
- Payback: Debt and the Shadow Side of Wealth, a 2008 book by Margaret Atwood
- Payback, a 2007 novel by James Heneghan
- Payback: The Conspiracy to Destroy Michael Milken and his Financial Revolution, a 1995 book by Daniel Fischel

=== Music ===
- Payback Records, an Australian record company

==== Albums ====
- Payback (album), a 2012 album by Danny!, or the title song
- The Payback, a 1974 album by James Brown, or the title song (see below)

==== Songs ====
- "Payback" (Flaw song), 2001
- "Payback" (Rascal Flatts song), 2014
- "The Payback" (song), by James Brown, 1973
- "Payback", by Bobby Sheen, 1973
- "Payback", by Juicy J, Kevin Gates, Future and Sage the Gemini from Furious 7: Original Motion Picture Soundtrack, 2015
- "Payback", by Montell Jordan from This Is How We Do It, 1995
- "Payback", by Quarashi from Guerilla Disco, 2004
- "Payback", by Slayer from God Hates Us All, 2001

=== Television ===
==== Series ====
- Payback (American TV series), a 2006 reality show
- Payback (British TV series), a 2023 crime thriller series
- Payback: Money and Power, a 2023 South Korean action thriller series
- Payback (Thai TV series), a 2026 thriller and boys' love series
- WWE Payback, a 2013–2023 professional wrestling pay-per-view event

==== Episodes ====
- "Payback" (The Boys), 2022
- "Payback" (Brandy & Mr. Whiskers), 2005
- "Payback" (Brooklyn Nine-Nine), 2015
- "Payback" (CSI: Miami), 2005
- "Payback" (Doctors), 2003
- "Payback" (Law & Order: Special Victims Unit), 1999
- "Payback" (Miami Vice), 1986
- "Payback" (Midnight Caller), 1988
- "Payback" (Third Watch), 2003
- "Payback" (White Collar), 2011
- "Payback", an episode of True Justice, 2011

=== Video games ===
- Payback (video game), a 2001 game developed by Apex Designs
- Soldier of Fortune: Payback, the third installment in the Soldier of Fortune (SOF) series
- Need for Speed: Payback

== Other uses ==
- Payback period, the period of time required for the return on an investment
- Payback Press, a defunct specialist imprint of Canongate Books
- Operation Payback, an ongoing operation by the hacking group Anonymous

== See also ==
- Back Pay (disambiguation)
