= Income-contingent repayment =

Loans for which repayment is based on future annual income

Income-contingent repayment is an arrangement for the repayment of a loan where the regular (e.g. monthly) amount to be paid by the borrower depends on his or her income. This type of repayment arrangement is mostly used for student loans, where the ability of the new graduate borrower to repay is usually limited by his or her income.

== Australia ==
After a period of free tertiary education Australia introduced the Higher Education Contribution Scheme (HECS) in 1989. Through the scheme the government sought to recover some of the costs of higher education by charging tuition fees and allowing students to defer payment of these fees until the student's income reached a certain level. Their HECS debt could be repaid through the tax system.

== United Kingdom ==
Income-contingent repayment has been available for student loans in the United Kingdom since 1998. The Student Loans Company (SLC) that manages student loans for students studying in the UK makes sure that the repayment of loans only begins after the student has left higher education and is earning over a threshold of:

- £18,330 for Plan 1 loans: (Scotland and Northern Ireland) & (England and Wales for loans taken before 1 September 2012)
- £25,000 for Plan 2 loans: (England and Wales for loans taken after 1 September 2012)

These loan repayments are collected via the pay-as-you-earn (PAYE) tax system by employers deducting them from the salary of their employees and passing the money on to HM Revenue and Customs (HMRC) along with other contributions (income tax and national insurance). HMRC then provides the full financial year's worth of deductions to the Student Loans Company beginning from May after the financial year and may provide updates until December. Customers receive their statements 30 days after their accounts are updated. The loans are also repaid through tax returns by self assessment, with payments due by January following the end of the financial year and forwarded to SLC in April. Customers who reside or work overseas are required to contact SLC to arrange repayment of their loans directly to SLC with another means of income assessment. This is different from the previous "mortgage style" loans, which have now been sold by SLC to other loan companies including Erudio Student Loans, Theisis Servicing and Honours Student Loans, that set a fixed monthly payment irrespective of the graduate's income.

== United States ==
Four income-driven repayment plans are available for U.S. federal student loans (one of which is named Income-Contingent Repayment).

== See also ==
- Income share agreement
