= Income share agreement =

Financial structure in which a portion of income is paid for a fixed number of years

An income share agreement (or ISA) is a financial structure in which an individual or organization provides something of value (often a fixed amount of money) to a recipient who, in exchange, agrees to pay back a percentage of their income for a fixed number of years.

ISAs have gained prominence as an alternative to the traditional student loan system in American higher education, and a number of private companies now offer ISAs for a variety of purposes, including as a funding source for college tuition. ISAs are often considered to be less financially risky to a borrower than a traditional private student loan.

In the UK this type of agreement received final FCA (UK financial regulator) approval, under a unique regulatory framework. So far StepEx is the only firm to operate as a regulated ISA provider, underwriting the credit with funds from large UK financial institutions.

== Characteristics ==
Income share agreements are characterized by a percentage share of future income for some specified period of time. They can function like non-voting shares in a company where the individual student is treated like a company. In the American system, this usually involves the investor transferring funds to an individual in exchange for a fixed percentage of their future income. Other features of income share agreements may include a) a fixed duration of time for the income sharing b) an income exemption where the borrower does not owe anything below a certain income, and/or c) a buyout option, where the borrower may pay some specified fee to exit the contract prior to the full duration of the term. Some ISA investors offer different terms to different students based on their predicted likelihood of success, while others offer the same terms to all students. Potential groups of investors could include for-profit companies, altruistic non-profits, alumni groups, educational institutions, and local, state, or federal governments.

== History ==
Milton Friedman originally proposed the concept in 1955, in his essay "The Role of Government in Education", in which he argued that students might beneficially be funded through an "equity investment" such that:

[Investors] could "buy" a share in an individual’s earning prospects: to advance him the funds needed to finance his training on condition that he agree to pay the lender a specified fraction of his future earnings. In this way, a lender would get back more than his initial investment from relatively successful individuals, which would compensate for the failure to recoup his original investment from the unsuccessful.

In the 1970s Yale University attempted a modified form of Friedman's proposal with several cohorts of undergraduate students. At Yale, instead of making individual contracts for a fixed number of years, all members of the cohort agreed to pay back a percentage of earnings until the entire cohort's balance had been paid off. However, the system left students frustrated that they were paying more than their fair share, by being forced to make payments on behalf of peers unwilling or unable to pay back their loans.

In 2013, Oregon legislators passed a bill that would investigate Pay It Forward as a college financing scheme. The model would allow students to attend college tuition-free, and then pay a proportion of their incomes post-graduation to finance the cost of their studies. However, unlike the income share agreement model, Pay It Forward would be publicly funded, and it would offer fixed percentage repayments across all institutions.

Public debate over the Oregon plan led to renewed interest in equity-based funding models, including a prominent summit on income share agreements at the New America Foundation and a policy paper from the American Enterprise Institute. On April 9, 2014, Senator Marco Rubio announced the introduction of legislation in the US Congress that would 'broaden the use' of income share agreements.

In the United States today, ISAs are offered by some universities and by some skills training programs, such as coding boot camps.

== Advantages ==
Proponents of ISAs argue that they provide significant benefits over existing models of college financing:

=== Efficient allocation of resources ===
Since investors have an incentive to allow students to pay lower shares of their income when they enroll in high quality, low-cost educational programs, ISAs lead to a more efficient allocation of financial resources between colleges.

=== Insurance and downside protection ===
ISAs reduce risk for students, and therefore act as an insurance policy for graduates with low earnings:

[With an ordinary student loan] my nominal monthly payment is fixed but my income could change or go away altogether (making certainty just a monthly repetition of bad news). With an income share agreement the converse is true: I don’t know what my nominal monthly payment will be over the entire term, or how much I will pay overall, but I do know that I will always be able to afford it.

This is a non-trivial benefit, since we know, based on current studies that student loans can impact both short-term career outcomes and long term wealth. For instance, recent articles indicate that student loans make it difficult for individuals to participate in the stock market to build long term wealth:

"My money is spent servicing student loans," said Marcus Wallace, a 25-year-old waiter in Washington, D.C. Until that debt is reduced, he explained, the great stock market bull run will have to go on without him.

=== Lower job search costs ===
Research indicates that income based repayments make students' career outcomes more efficient by making the job search process less costly.

Students that need education finance the most (including low income, minority, and first generation students) also typically have limited social capital like family-based networks and career mentors that are frequently critical to success in the job market. ISAs augmented with career development provide a nice way to overcome such limitations.

== Relevant laws by country ==
=== United States ===
The US allows its citizens to have income sharing agreements.

== Common concerns ==
=== Indentured servitude ===
One of the most frequently cited concerns with Income Share Agreements is that they are a form of indentured servitude. Critics argue that because students owe a percentage of their income, the investor therefore own a piece of the student. For instance, Kevin Roose wrote in New York magazine that ISA companies give "young people in the post-crash economy the chance to indenture themselves to patrons in the investor class."

However, advocates of ISAs contend that since students have no legal obligation to work in a particular industry, and since it is illegal for investors to pressure them into a certain career, students are no more “indentured” than those with a student loan. In fact, someone with a traditional student loan has less choice than someone with an ISA, because the student with a loan needs to be in a career where they make at least enough income to cover their monthly payment, whereas someone with an ISA can choose to never make any money, and would never owe the investor a dime.

=== Uncaptured positive externalities ===
Since Income Share Agreements are priced based on likely economic success, critics argue that programs that are not economically viable but still valuable to society may not receive ISAs. For instance, a Masters of Social Work is an expensive degree, but social workers often are not paid very much. Therefore, investors may not offer Income Share Agreements for social workers given current tuition rates.

=== Discrimination ===
In 2014, the conservative think-tank, American Enterprise Institute (AEI) argued that there are no documented cases of discrimination based on race or gender with ISA agreements, but some worry that should ISAs become a more popular model, the potential for discrimination could increase. While there are already anti-discrimination laws in most financial markets that would likely apply to ISA investors, the question, as of now, has not been completely resolved. AEI also argued that ISAs are less discriminatory as compared to loans:

Even when everyone receives the same interest rate, loans discriminate intensely on the dimension that really matters: affordability. Under a loan program with the same terms for all borrowers, a group who earns less than another despite having identical qualifications ends up with proportionally lower income after paying off that loan than the other group. To the extent that any systematic difference in income between two groups is unfair, loans in effect amplify the unfairness. If ISAs pool groups with similar qualifications but different income potential, then ISAs will partially address the unfairness that loans amplify.

In 2022, a national education and workforce policy non-profit, Jobs for the Future (JFF) published a study on a proprietary data set of 7,639 ISA contracts from an education ISA program manager for 51 education providers. The study's findings found:

- Schools with higher shares of Black students offered roughly the same contract terms as other schools, while Black students’ monthly payments were lower than those of other students.
- Schools with higher shares of Latinx students offered the same income shares and thresholds but a slightly longer payment period, though Latinx students’ monthly payments were also lower than those of other students.
- Schools with higher shares of female students offered slightly shorter contracts, but there was no difference in monthly payment amounts between female and male students.

=== Creaming ===
Some people worry that ISAs would have the effect of "creaming" the best students and only funding elite institutions. However, in theory, ISAs should fund all economically viable programs—those where the future income of their graduates proportionately aligns with the cost of the degree. The only way the concern of 'creaming' would be valid is if the vast majority of institutions are not economically viable.

== Institutions That Offer Income Share Agreements ==
Income Share Agreements are steadily gaining traction among professional investors, skills training programs, accredited colleges and universities, with many prominent programs offering Income Share Agreements as a part of their tuition options. However, as of 2022, many colleges and universities have ended paused their ISA programs.

Institutions that have offered ISAs include:

=== Northeastern University ===
Northeastern University is a private research university located in Boston, Massachusetts. It offers both undergraduate and graduate level programs. Northeastern accepts Income Share Agreements as a means of financing for its accelerated online nursing program.

=== Purdue University ===
Purdue University is a traditional, 4-year university offering both undergraduate and graduate level programs. Purdue offered a limited funding ISA program that allows select Sophomore, Junior, and Senior level students who need additional funding to finish their degree programs. Purdue offered this program because they saw a gap in their student financing options for students who had exhausted their other financing sources. However, the program was paused in the school year 2022-2023 - allegedly as a result of having to change payment-collection vendors.

=== University of Utah ===
University of Utah is a public research university offering undergraduate and graduate level courses. Their Income Share Agreement program offers students in all majors who are within 2 years of completing their degree an ISA valued between $3,000 and $10,000. Their Income Share Agreement program is designed to fill any gaps their students may have that are not filled by other forms of financial aid. But as of 2022, only 121 students had taken advantage of the ISA program since it launched in 2019.

== See also ==
- Human Capital Contract
- Income-driven repayment
