= Pey =

Pey or PEY may refer to:

== People ==
- José Miguel Pey de Andrade (1763–1838), Colombian statesman
- Pey de Garros (1530–1585), Occitan poet
- Víctor Pey (1915–2018), Spanish engineer, professor, and businessman

== Places ==
- Pey, Landes, Nouvelle-Aquitaine, France
- Pey, Netherlands, in Echt-Susteren municipality, Netherlands

== Other ==
- Pey or Pe (Semitic letter)
- Petjo language, by ISO 639

== See also ==
- Pay (disambiguation)
