= Pay Less =

Pay Less, PayLess, Pay-Less, or Payless may refer to:

- Pay Less Drug Store, founded by Lorenzo L Skaggs in Rochester, Minnesota, and later became Osco
- Payless Drug Store, founded by Levi Justin Skaggs in Tacoma, Washington, and which later became Skaggs Companies
- Payless for Drug and Food, a Canadian store
- Pay Less Food Markets, a grocery store chain in central Indiana acquired by Kroger in 1999
- Payless Car Rental, an automobile rental company
- Payless DIY, a chain of do-it-yourself stores in Britain, merged in 1990 into rival chain Do It All, which later merged into Focus DIY
- Pay Less DIY, a chain of do-it-yourself stores in Ireland, renamed to become Woodie's DIY
- Payless (footwear retailer), an international discount footwear retailer

== See also ==
- Less (disambiguation)
- Pay (disambiguation)
