= Pay as you go =

Pay as you go, PAYGO, PAUG or PAYG may refer to:

== Finance ==
- Pay-as-you-go tax, or pay-as-you-earn tax
- Pay-as-you-earn tax, also called a pay-as-you-go tax
- Pay-as-you-go pension plan
- Pay as you go (credit derivatives), a structured financial product
- Pay as you go (social program financing), the practice of financing expenditures with current funds rather than borrowing
- A form of payment where the charge is only deducted at the point of usage, instead of paying for a specified service in advance, for example:
  - Prepaid mobile phone
  - Pay as you go ticketing on public transport

== Music ==
- Pay As U Go, a UK garage crew

== See also ==
- PAYE (disambiguation)
