= Pay As You Earn =

2012 US Student Loan Relief program

Pay As You Earn (PAYE) is a federal student loan relief program signed into law on December 21, 2012, by President Barack Obama. It is one of four income-driven repayment plans.

== Qualification ==
Only new borrowers may qualify if they received a disbursement on a loan on or after October 1, 2011. One qualifies as a new borrower if he/she had no outstanding balance on a Direct Loan or FFEL Program loan when he/she received a Direct Loan or FFEL Program loan on or after October 1, 2007. As with Income-Based Repayment (IBR), the borrower must prove partial financial hardship.

== Changes and extension ==
President Obama's 2015 budget proposed substantial changes to the Pay as You Earn program. In addition to extending the program to all borrowers, regardless of when their first loans were disbursed, it proposed certain limits to PAYE that are designed to "protect against institutional practices that may further increase student indebtedness, while ensuring the program provides sufficient relief for students committed to public service." These proposed changes include:

- Eliminating the standard payment cap under PAYE so that high-income, high-balance borrowers pay an equitable share of their earnings as their income rises;
- Calculating payments for married borrowers filing separately on the combined household Adjusted Gross Income;
- Capping Public Sector Loan Forgiveness (PSLF) at the aggregate loan limit for independent undergraduate students to protect against institutional practices that may further increase student indebtedness, while ensuring the program provides sufficient relief for students committed to public service;
- Establishing a 25-year forgiveness period for borrowers with balances above the aggregate loan limit for independent undergraduate students;
- Preventing payments made under non-income driven repayment plans from being applied toward PSLF to ensure that loan forgiveness is targeted to students with the greatest need; and
- Capping the amount of interest that can accrue when a borrower's monthly payment is insufficient to cover the interest to avoid ballooning loan balances.

In sum, although the budget proposes to expand PAYE to all borrowers, it severely restricts its benefits for those with high income/high student loan balances and for those pursuing careers in public interest. If passed, it is unclear whether those who borrowed prior to the implemented changes will be grandfathered in to existing PAYE, IBR, and PSLF plans.

On June 9, 2014, President Barack Obama announced an executive order to extend the Pay as You Earn (PAYE) repayment to student loans acquired before October 2007.

== Eligible loans ==
- Direct Subsidized and Unsubsidized Loans
- Direct Plus Loans for Graduates and Professionals

== Ineligible loans ==
- Private Loans
- Parent Plus Loans

== See also ==
- Tax withholding in the United States
- Federal Perkins Loan
- Stafford loan
- Federal Direct Student Loan Program
- Federal student loan consolidation
