= Pay-e Borj =

Pay-e Borj پابرج
- Village
- Location within Iran
- Coordinates: 33°52′18″N 48°15′17″E
- Country: Iran
- Province: Lorestan
- County: Selseleh
- Bakhsh: Central
- Rural District: Qaleh-ye Mozaffari

Population (2006)
  - Total: 193
- Time zone: UTC+3:30 (IRST)
  - Summer (DST): UTC+4:30 (IRDT)

Pay-e Borj (Persian: پابرج, also Romanized as Pāy-e Borj and Pā Borj) is a village in Qaleh-ye Mozaffari Rural District, in the Central District of Selseleh County, Lorestan Province, Iran. At the 2006 census, its population was 193, in 38 families.
