= Pay-e Rah =

Pay-e Rah پايراه
- Village
- Location within Iran
- Coordinates: 32°15′32″N 49°46′32″E
- Country: Iran
- Province: Khuzestan
- County: Andika
- Bakhsh: Chelo
- Rural District: Chelo

Population (2006)
  - Total: 24
- Time zone: UTC+3:30 (IRST)
  - Summer (DST): UTC+4:30 (IRDT)

Pay-e Rah (Persian: پايراه, also Romanized as Pāy-e Rāh) is a village in Chelo Rural District, Chelo District, Andika County, Khuzestan Province, Iran. At the 2006 census, its population was 24, in 4 families.
