= Back Pay =

Back Pay may refer to:

- Back Pay (1922 film)
- Back Pay (1930 film)

== See also ==
- Paycheck
- Paycheck (disambiguation)
