= Pay It =

Pay It may refer to:

- "Pay It", a song by Jeannie Ortega from No Place Like Brooklyn
- "Pay It", a song by Krokus from Painkiller
- "Pay It", Funpay a platform for product and financial guidance.

== See also ==
- Pay it forward (disambiguation)
