= Daniel Paye =

Liberian footballer (born 2000)

Personal information
- Full name: Daniel Y. Paye
- Date of birth: 7 October 2000 (age 26)
- Place of birth: Monrovia, Liberia
- Height: 5 ft 11 in (1.80 m)
- Position: Center-back

Senior career*
Years	Team	Apps	(Gls)
2019–2021	FC Bea Mountain		
2021–2022	Jammerbugt	6	(0)
2022–	FC Bea Mountain		

International career
2021	Liberia	2	(0)
- * Club domestic league appearances and goals

Daniel Y. Paye (born 7 October 2000) is a Liberian professional footballer who plays as a center-back for Liberian club FC Bea Mountain.

== Club career ==
From 2019 to 2021, Paye played for FC Bea Mountain. In 2021, he joined Danish club Jammerbugt on a three-year deal. His debut for the club came in a 3–0 league loss to Helsingør on 18 March 2022.

== International career ==
Paye made his debut for the Liberia national team in a 1–0 friendly loss to Mauritania on 11 June 2021.
