= Repayment plan =

Structured series of loan repayments

In finance, a repayment plan is a structured repaying of funds that have been loaned to an individual, business or government over either a standard or extended period of time, typically alongside a payment of interest. Repayment plans are prominent within the financial industry of a national economy where liquid funds are in high demand to assist in investment opportunities, governmental expenditure or personal finance. The term first saw prominence with its use by the International Monetary Fund to describe its form of financial loan repayment from individual nations. Typically, the term "repayment plan" refers to the system of Federal Student Aid in the United States of America, which assists in covering tertiary education expenses of domestic students.

== History ==
Repayment plans have historically existed within the economies of the developed world where the financial markets are more established and have expanded over a longer period of time. During the expansion of the global economies during the 20th Century, the case for greater regulation and development of finances had grown substantially, with global debt increasing as nations invested domestically and internationally to fuel their own economic growth. Borrowed funds from both foreign governments and international financial institutions aided the growth of availability for liquid funds for world governments, while domestically, consumers saw lower interest rates, simultaneously making the attraction of loans more enticing. Repayment plans are thus often referred to as loan repayment or debt financing strategies.

The International Monetary Fund is a global credit organisation. Dark green - Members of the IMF. Light Green - Countries who have not committed to membership

Historically, the International Monetary Fund acted as the principal international credit body and has existed since 1945. It primarily operates as a credit organisation with a long-term goal of facilitating greater international financial stability between 189 countries globally
One of the functions of the International Monetary Fund is distributing loans to countries in financial crises while simultaneously aiming to improve general economic conditions globally. By issuing loans, the International Monetary Fund and the receiving nation agree upon a pre-specified repayment strategy called a 'system of conditionality'. The 'system of conditionality' operates similarly to the financial jargon of 'repayment plan' and refers to a plan cooperatively managed by both the International Monetary Fund and the receiving nation in overcoming the financial hardship which led the nation in seeking IMF assistance. For example, on May 3, 2010, Eurozone countries alongside the IMF announced their intention to enforce a three-year €110bn loan, with a 5.5% interest rate, with a 'system of conditionality' implemented i.e. on a condition that austerity measures would be enacted by the Greek government in accordance with the life of the loan.

Systems of conditionality are not restricted to nations however, and individuals and businesses can also be subjected to conditionality by the financial institution or government body which has approved the loan. After agreeing to all conditions and other aspects of financing a loan, for example approved prior credit history and credit score, repayment plans and loans can be implemented relatively quickly. However, creditors do not always have a regard for individual circumstances which can violate personal financial stability, which can lead to further issues which do not necessarily have to be accounted for by credit providers.

As the means of acquiring finance have increased, so have respective organisations which can assist in managing depleted personal funds and clearing individual debt, including government websites such as the Australian Securities and Investment Commission's MoneySmart website, and through independent creditors.

== Recent years ==
=== The Greek government debt-crisis ===
The collapse of the Greek national economy after the 2008 financial crisis, resulted in political instability, social exclusion and economic 'brain-drain' in Greece. Government policy and reform spanned 12 rounds of tax increases, spending cuts and a number of bailout loans by the International Monetary Fund and the Eurogroup in the years 2010, 2012 and 2015. It became the first developed country to fail to repay an IMF loan on time, following a delay of 20 days in late June 2015. National governmental debt approached €323bn by July 2015, below the OECD average, and since 2009, the debt had grown €18bn, from €300bn to €318bn (a 6% increase overall). Months prior to the implementation of the Second Economic Adjustment Programme, leaders of Eurozone agreed to extend loan repayment periods from 7 years to a minimum of 15 years and to reduce interest rates to 3.5%. These changes succeeded a reduction in Greek primary deficit from €25bn in 2009 to €5bn in 2011. However, conditions of the recession had worsened despite the austerity measured implemented at the time, leading to a 7.1% fall in national GDP and a rise in unemployment from 7.5% in late 2008 to 19.9% in November 2011.

The Third Economic Adjustment Programme implemented from July 2015 to August 2018 was the last of the consolidated austerity programmes implemented by Greece in the attempt to recover from the 2008 financial crisis. An €86 billion loan was provided to Greece over the three-year period and assisted in a final restructure of the Greek economy. It is not considered the last of the 'bailout programs' offered to Greece as the nation continues to receive loans from external creditors such as the IMF and continental banks including the European Investment Bank, Eurogroup and European Central Bank.

Following the election of right-wing political parties in the regional and Euroelections during May 2019, Greek stocks rose by approximately 9.10%. This coincided with greater investor confidence in the Greek economy, which showed positive signs of recovering economic growth and a reduction in national debt. In the same period, Greece intended to repay €3.9bn to the International Monetary Fund earlier than originally agreed upon, however this action has been met with negative criticism by critics and creditors, who cite increased fiscal concerns and new potential sanctions as a result of the election result. The European Stability Mechanism's Board of Directors have praised Greece's ability to meet recent repayment deadlines, claiming that Greece's continuation of economic reforms set by the International Monetary Fund will "boost Greece's growth potential" in the long term but there will be a persistent push for Greece's repayment of all its loans.

=== Federal Student Aid ===
Federal Student Aid refers to the United States' government's financial initiative in assisting domestic and international students access higher education. Payments begin after the graduation of a student, leave school or change if the students' rate of attendance is shortened. It covers a range of loans which cater to a diverse range of student needs.

- Subsidized and Unsubsidized loans refer to loans offered over a 4-year period to assist in covering costs associated with college, university, or any other form of tertiary education. Subsidized loans are granted to undergraduate students who have appropriately demonstrated financial need/hardship. Unsubsidized loans can be granted to both undergraduate and postgraduate students regardless of financial position. Both types of loans are subjected to a maximum loan period of 150% the education length (in years) i.e. a four-year course would be subjected to a maximum loan period of six years, as well as a loan fee upon the granting of the loan and additional interest repayments upon progress of the loan commitment. Interest rates are calculated as a fixed rate over the life of the loan (5.05% for undergraduate Subsidized Loans and Unsubsidized Loans and 6.6% for graduate/professional Unsubsidized Loans).
- Direct PLUS loans are federal loans available to postgraduate and professional students, and the parents of those who attend schools who are participating in the Direct Loan Program including college or career schools. Adverse credit histories will negatively affect a student or parents' compatibility to receive the loan. The loan is subject to a repayment interest rate of 7.6% over the course of the loan.
- Federal Perkins Loan program are repayment plans available to undergraduate and graduate students who have demonstrated exceptional financial need and attended college or career school. The loan is subject to a fixed interest rate of 5%.

One repayment plan option for student loans is a graduated repayment schedule. Borrowers can lower their monthly loan payments for a while — without extending their repayment period — by opting for graduated repayment. A Graduated Repayment Program lets the borrower make smaller payments back toward their student loans at the start of their new term. Every 2 years on this program the monthly payment will increase. This is meant to match with the increased income of the borrower over time.

The Federal government of the United States are not the only providers of student loans, as private student loans can also be obtained by student through banks, credit unions, state agencies and schools. Federal loans are subjected to fixed interest rates, no credit checks and option to have the type of repayment plan selected. For example, the student may elect to have their repayment connected to a percentage of their discretionary income, or as a fixed amount regardless of income level.

== Criticism ==
Repayment plans have the potential to bring upon individuals other financial issues, including financial hardship in the form of poverty, and also reliance on welfare systems. Taxpayers, students and other demographics can be drawn into repayment strategies which may not be financially feasible and may result in a default or repossession of assets. In the United States, individuals can initiate repayment plans with the IRS with instalments estimated based on annual income of the individual if they are not able to deliver their full tax amount. Despite the IRS mandated to cease acceptance of repayments once an individual is classed as experiencing “economic hardship”, it has been suggested that the IRS has been allowing repayments from individuals who are suffering financially despite demonstrating incapability of repayment. For the IRS to analyse an individual's repayment potential, the individual must submit documents with supporting and relevant financial information so that an appropriate repayment system can be established, which not all individuals would be capable of producing. These repayment plans provided by the IRS to taxpayers have resulted in 39% of taxpayers in the U.S. defaulting on their plans based on incorrectly estimated instalments which can force individuals into difficult financial situations.

Students in the U.S. have also levelled criticism at the Federal government, with past and present students owing approximately US$1.5 trillion in outstanding student loans. Students have multiple ways of clearing student debt through invoking bankruptcy, however if it is not cleared, loan repayments can affect future budget expenses. For a student to file for bankruptcy, they must undergo The Brunner Test to measure the extent of the financial hardship experienced by the student. The Brunner Test for students has to be satisfied by 3 means:

- The recipient has no means of maintaining a basic or reasonable standard of living if they were to be compelled to make loan payments.
- The hardship involved in repaying loans will last for the bulk of the loans' repayment period/the financial situation is unlikely to change for the bulk of the repayment period.
- There has been a reasonable effort made to repay loans already.

These requirements can be fulfilled through a bankruptcy court with students presenting all necessary documents, as well as completing a means test, which relates personal income to median income on a state-wide scale, with an approximately equivalent household size.

Measures to counter larger amounts of student debt are through “grace periods” provided by the office of Federal Student Aid, which offers a six to nine-month time-frame where graduate students do not have to begin repaying their student loan until after the assigned time period. However, “grace periods” allow for the accrual of interest, which is then added to the principal amount, costing students more.

Repayment plans vary according to lender and recipient, and can be based upon income, a fixed rate, a variable rate, or on systems of conditionality. For individuals who are unable to budget, or contain expenses, entering and thereafter completing repayment plans can be extremely difficult and result in poverty, bankruptcy or homelessness. For individuals, including those of the millennial generation who are facing great economic uncertainty, maintaining and managing a budget can be particularly difficult and challenging, as the rising costs of standards of living including food, utilities, property and finance can force individuals into repayment plans which may be detrimental to long-term standard of living.

== See also ==
- Debt management plan
- Debt relief
- Debt restructuring
- Bankruptcy
