= Pay It Forward (financial aid policy) =

Pay It Forward is a model in the United States for financing higher education under which students attend college tuition-free, and after graduating begin to pay a fixed percentage into a fund to pay for future students' tuition. Pay It Forward legislation was first passed by the Oregon state legislature in 2013.

== History ==
Pay It Forward was first proposed by the Economic Opportunity Institute. The idea became the focus of a capstone class at Portland State University, which hosted a legislative panel and presented a report to Oregon legislators on the model. A study bill on the program was sponsored by Rep. Michael Dembrow and passed unanimously in the Oregon legislature.
