= Higher education bubble in the United States =

Economic trend

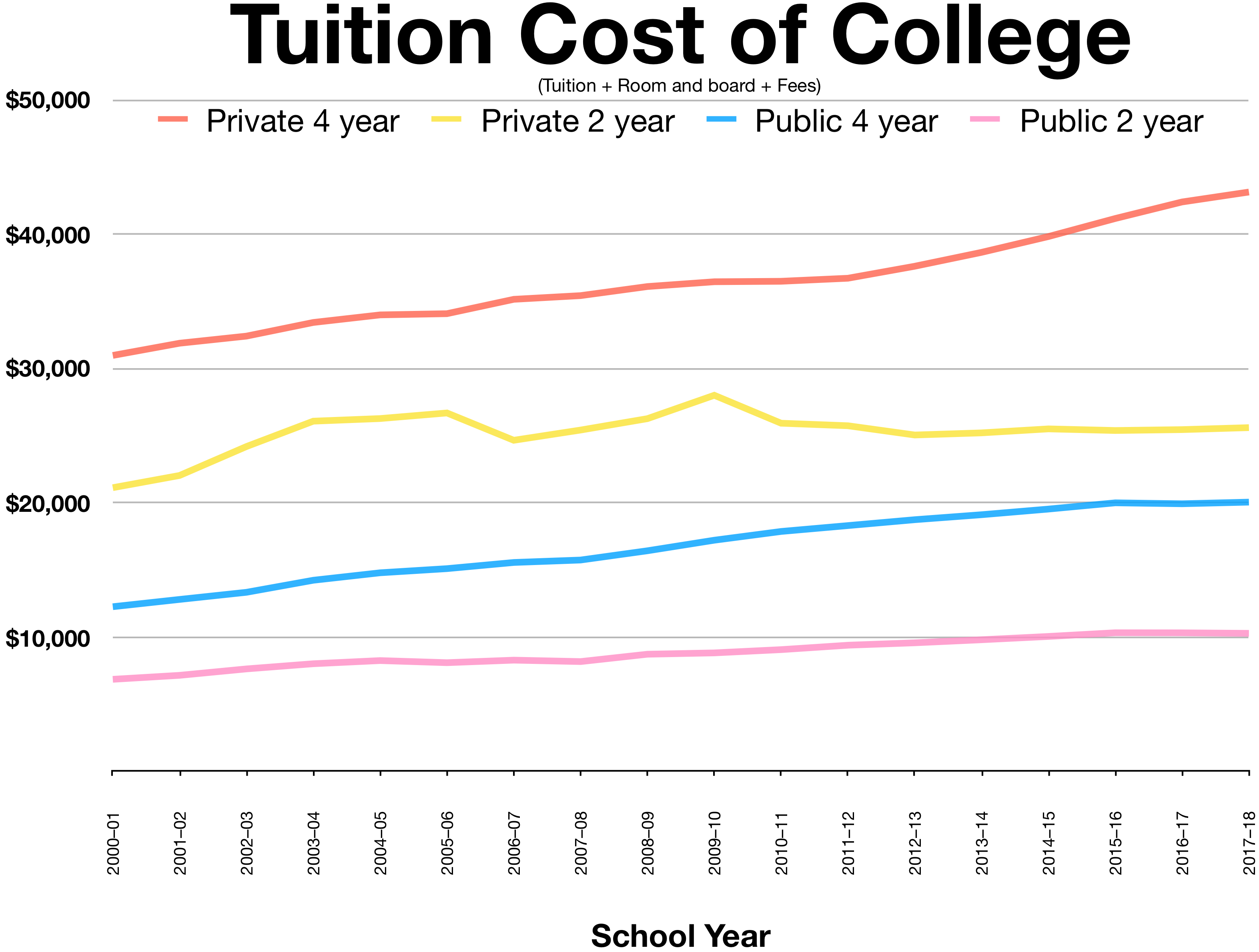
Average college tuition from the 2000–2001 school year to the 2017–2018 school year.

There is concern that the possible higher education bubble in the United States could have negative repercussions in the broader economy. Although college tuition payments are rising, the supply of college graduates in many fields of study is exceeding the demand for their skills, which aggravates graduate unemployment and underemployment while increasing the burden of student loan defaults on financial institutions and taxpayers. The higher education bubble might be even more serious than the load of student debts. Without safeguards in place for funding and loans, the government risks creating a moral hazard in which schools charge students expensive tuition fees without offering them marketable skills in return. The claim has generally been used to justify cuts to public higher education spending, tax cuts, or a shift of government spending towards law enforcement and national security. There is a further concern that having an excess supply of college graduates exacerbates political instability, historically linked to having a bulge in the number of young degree holders, a phenomenon known as elite overproduction.

Some economists reject the notion of a higher education bubble, noting that the returns on higher education vastly outweigh the cost. However, this does not account for survival bias, given that around 40% of students at four-year universities will not graduate. As of 2012, 29% of student debtors never graduated, and those who did could take decades to pay back the money they owed.

Others believe number of institutions of higher education in the United States will fall in the 2020s and beyond, citing reasons of demographic decline, poor outcomes, economic problems, and changing public interests and attitudes. According to the U.S. Department of Education, by the late 2010s, people with technical or vocational trainings are slightly more likely to be employed than those with a bachelor's degree and significantly more likely to be employed in their fields of specialty. The United States currently suffers from a shortage of skilled tradespeople.

The Federal Reserve Bank of St. Louis noted in 2019 that investment in higher education has reached a point of diminishing marginal returns. Undergraduate and graduate enrollments have both been in decline, while trade schools continue to attract growing numbers of students. Young men are a major group opting for alternatives to higher education. Many faculty members are leaving academia, especially those from the humanities. At the same time, university graduates are likely to regret having studied the humanities and liberal arts. While academics maintain that certain subjects are worth studying for their own sake, students are more concerned with increasing their earning potential. So far this century, numerous institutions of higher learning have permanently closed, especially rural liberal arts colleges, community colleges, and for-profit institutions.

It is possible that the bubble will not burst, but rather deflate.

== Background ==
Due to the GI Bill and the population boom after World War II, demand for higher education grew significantly during the latter half of the twentieth century, making it one of the major growth sectors for the American economy. Historically, high schools separated students on career tracks, but this changed in the late 1980s and early 1990s, when the mission of high schools shifted to preparing students for college.

In 1987, U.S. Secretary of Education William Bennett suggested that the availability of loans was fueling an increase in tuition prices and an education bubble. The "Bennett hypothesis" claimed that readily available loans allow schools to increase tuition without regard to demand elasticity. In addition, college rankings were partially driven by spending levels, and higher tuition was also correlated with increased public perceptions of prestige. From the 1980s to the 2010s, demand for higher education increased, especially after the Great Recession of 2007–2009 when Americans flocked back to school in order to adapt to the new economy.

A 2011 study from the Labor Department found that a bachelor's degree "represents a significant advantage in the job market." In 2011, The Chronicle of Higher Education ran an article which said that the future was bright for college graduates. The data also suggested that, notwithstanding a slight increase in 2008–09, student loan default rates had declined between the mid-1980s and 1990s and early 2010s. The management consulting firm McKinsey & Company projected in 2011 that a shortage of college-educated workers and a surplus of workers without college degrees, which would cause the wage premium to increase and cause differences in unemployment rates to become even more dramatic.

As of 2018, 70% of high school graduates in the United States enrolled in tertiary education. But only 60% of those students, that is 42% of high school graduates, will graduate within 6 years with at least a Bachelor's degree. Note that Bachelor's degrees in the United States are typically designed to be completed in four years of full-time study, and Master's programs in the US are normally two years (full-time) in length.

Educational attainment in the United States (2018)
Education	Age 25 and over	Age 25–30
High school diploma or GED	89.80%	92.95%
Some college	61.28%	66.34%
Associate degree	45.16%	46.72%
Bachelor's degree	34.98%	36.98%
Master's degree	13.04%	9.01%
Professional degree	3.47%	2.02%
Doctorate	2.03%	1.12%

== Discussion ==
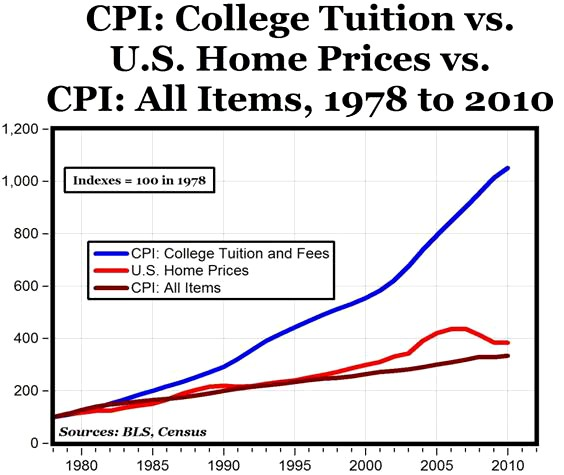
The cost of US college education relative to the consumer price index (inflation)

During the early 2010s, whether or not the "higher-education bubble" existed became a topic of debate among economists. Data has shown that although the wage premium (the difference in incomes between those with a four-year college degree and those with only a high school diploma) has increased dramatically since the 1970s, so has the 'debt load' incurred by students due to the tuition inflation. By 2019, the total college debt exceeded US$1.5 trillion, and two out of three college graduates were saddled with debt. Glenn Reynolds argued in his book, The Higher Education Bubble (2012), that higher education as a "product grows more and more elaborate—and more expensive—but the expense is offset by cheap credit provided by sellers who are eager to encourage buyers to buy." Reynolds called university degrees a marker of socioeconomic status. Economists Michael Spence and Joe Stiglitz suggest that much of the worth of a university degree lies not in the skills acquired, but rather market signaling. Because a university degree still had considerable value, higher education might be an example of a Veblen good, albeit a subtle rather than a conspicuous one. Students and schools increasingly view one another in purely transactional terms, with an overwhelming majority of Generation Z considers higher education to be a step towards lucrative careers.

Research from the Center for Household Financial Stability of the Federal Reserve Bank of St. Louis presented in 2018 predicted a positive albeit declining income premium for completing college but a declining wealth premium, which is almost indistinguishable from zero for the most recent cohort. Consequently, the average Millennial with a university degree earns 20% less than expected. It was thought that people with college degrees are much less likely than those without to be unemployed, even though they are more expensive to employ (they earn higher wages). In 2019, a report from the Federal Reserve Bank of St. Louis using data from the 2016 Survey of Consumer Finances concluded that after controlling for race and age cohort, families with heads of household with post-secondary education who were born before 1980 benefited from wealth and income premiums, while for families with heads of household with post-secondary education but born after 1980 the wealth premium has weakened to point of statistical insignificance due in part to the rising cost of college. Moreover, although the income premium remains positive, it had declined to historic lows with more pronounced downward trajectories with heads of household with postgraduate degrees.

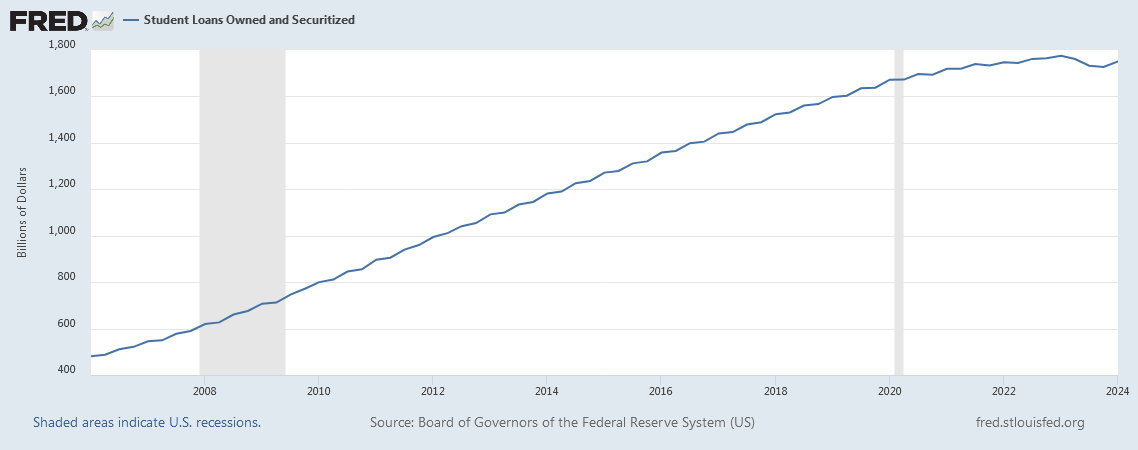
Data from the Federal Reserve shows that student debt rose steadily during the 2000s and 2010s.

This thesis came under stress in the 2010s, as institutions of higher education came under heightened skepticism due to high costs and disappointing results. People became increasingly concerned about debts and deficits, forcing institutions to prove their worth by clarifying how much money from which industry and company funded research, and how much it would cost to attend. Compared to the 1970s, the number of Americans with a university degree has quadrupled five decades later. Meanwhile, the skills in demand by the labor market has shifted. Technological advances have eliminated numerous low-skilled jobs while high-paying careers require highly specialized knowledge. Together, these factors have eroded the advantage of being a college graduate. By the 2020s, earning a degree from a prestigious university no longer guaranteed gainful employment immediately after graduation. According to Gallup, public confidence in higher education in the United States has declined considerably during the mid-2010s and the mid-2020s; even those with bachelor's or advanced degrees were less approving than before. Besides costs, skeptics voiced their concern over political bias and the lack of marketable skills of alumni.

An alternative thesis has suggested that there is no general bubble in higher education because, on average, higher education really does boost income and employment by more than enough to make it a good investment. The problem is that degrees in some specific fields may be overvalued because they do little to boost income or improve job prospects, and degrees in other fields may in fact be undervalued because students do not appreciate the extent to which these degrees could benefit their employment prospects and future income. Proponents of this argument have noted that schools charge equal prices for tuition regardless of what students study, but the interest rate on federal student loans is not adjusted according to risk. They have further noted that there is evidence that undergraduate students in their first three years of college are not very good at predicting future wages by major. Indeed, student interest has shifted away from low-paying programs towards those of greater value in the job market. (See chart below.)

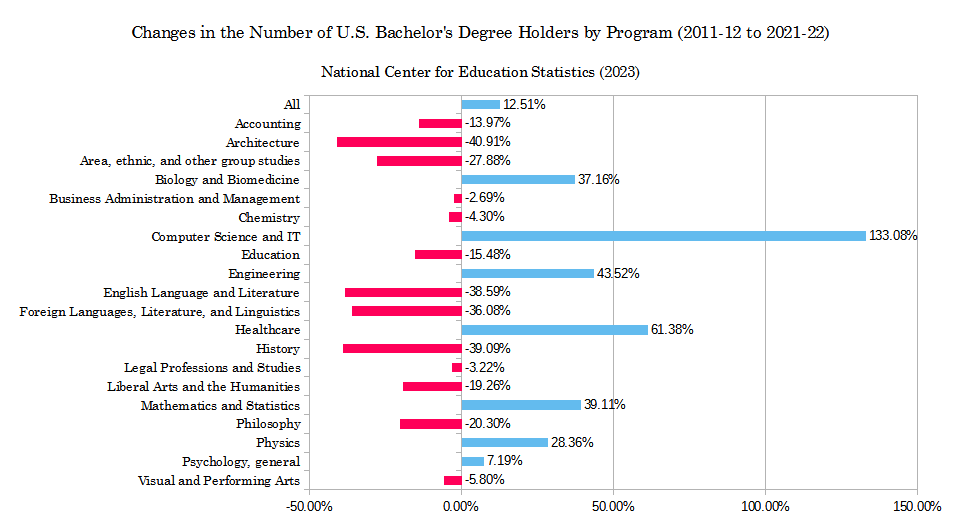
Healthcare and most STEM subjects, especially computer science, grew in popularity while the liberal arts and social studies, especially history, have declined due to market forces.

=== Recent trends ===
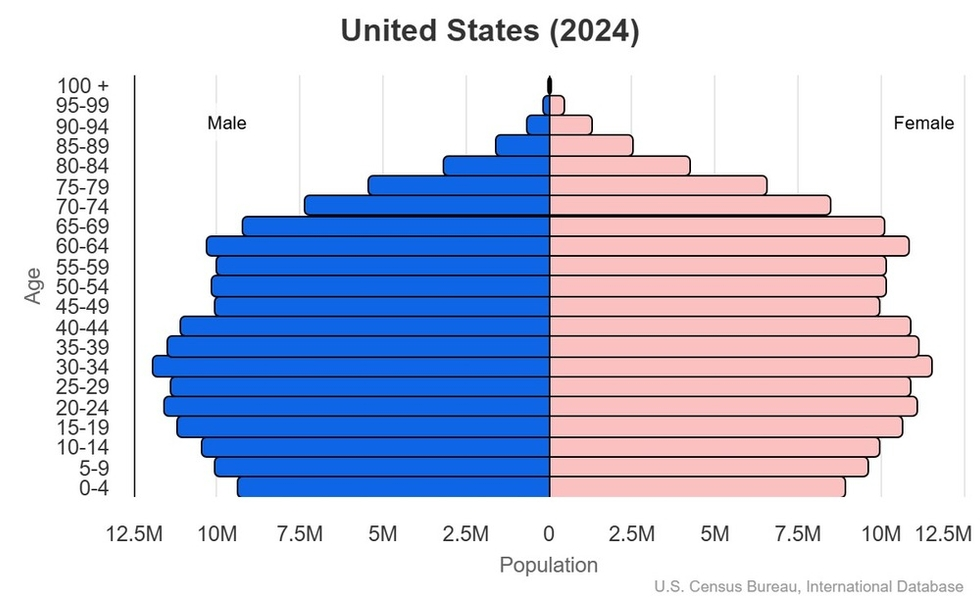
The population pyramid of the United States in 2024. The number of Americans of college age will drop by the late 2020s, at a faster rate by the late 2030s.

For decades, institutions of higher education have operated under the assumption that the number of students would keep growing. But the 2010s were a turbulent period for the sector in the United States. Small private colleges from across the country faced deep financial trouble as they had to make high tuition discounts in order to attract students at a time when higher education costs were increasing, regulation was becoming more stringent, and demographic constraints were tightening. In fact, domestic undergraduate enrollment has been on the decline for some time. Between 2010 and 2021, domestic enrollments dropped by 15%. By the early 2020s, enrollments were declining at a growing rate as the number of high-school graduates continued to fall. By 2022, only 62% of high-school graduates were heading for college compared to 70% in 2015.

Nevertheless, prestigious universities saw continued growth in the number of applicants and as such were in no danger of closing. This was due partly to students sending their applications to more schools for a chance of getting admitted and because (elite) institutions had not significantly expanded their capacities. Pew Trusts projected in 2022 that most U.S. states will see a decline in grade-school enrollments during the 2020s, which would help curb of the cost of higher education going forward. The Western Interstate Commission for Higher Education forecast a peak in the number of college-age people in 2025, followed by a 15-year-long decline. Other estimates using census data predict a decline of hundreds of thousands of college students per year during the 2030s.

A 2019 analysis by Moody's Investor Services estimated that about 20% of all small private liberal arts colleges in the United States were in serious financial trouble. Between the early 2000s and early 2020s, hundreds of institutions permanently closed their doors. In fact, they were closing at an accelerating rate, and for-profit institutions were the hardest hit, as they were targeted by stricter regulations from the Obama administration. Public universities had to downsize or to merge. Rural ones had closed majors across the board, from the humanities to the sciences. Even rural religiously affiliated institutions, which many students and parents prefer due to their opposition to secularism and their small-town locations, have also been facing severe challenges. More than half of the colleges and universities that remained saw substantial reductions in the number of students attending. Such institutions have adapted to the new reality by dropping programs with low student interest, including many in the liberal arts and the humanities, like gender studies and critical race theory, creating majors for emerging fields, such as artificial intelligence, and professional programs, like law enforcement, investing in online learning programs, and addressing untapped demands, such as mid-career training or continuing education. By the early 2020s, the rate of growth of tuition fees had dropped, and some schools were freezing or even cutting theirs. If affordable or free online learning continued to grow, then non-elite institutions would struggle to justify their physical infrastructure.

Colleges and universities have been criticized for offering degree programs that fail to provide students with relevant skills in the labor market after graduation, as well as grade inflation by lowering standards both for admission and coursework. Economist Bryan Caplan has argued the combination of more college graduates and weaker learning outcomes has led to credential inflation, in which employers ask for college degrees for jobs that don’t need one and previously did not require one. According to a Burning Glass Institute analysis of 2022 U.S. Census Bureau data, Bachelor’s degree holders in college-level jobs earn nearly 90% more than people with just a high-school diploma in their 20s, while 45% of college graduates are underemployed and earn 25% more than high-school graduates (not adjusting for any student loan debt of such graduates). Due to popular demand, the cost of higher education has grown at a rate faster than inflation between the late 20th and early 21st centuries. Student housing costs have risen faster than even tuition fees. From the 1990s to the 2010s, tuition and fees jumped 440%, as federal loans for students became more generous. Student debt has correspondingly increased as a result. PBS NewsHour business and economics correspondent Paul Solman has claimed that besides demand, other contributing factors are administrative bloat; more spending on amenities, such as food courts and recreational centers; and cuts in funding from state and federal authorities.

Among graduates of the early 2020s, about half thought they made a bad decision going to college. The most regretted majors include journalism, sociology, liberal arts/general studies, history, communications, and education; the least regretted majors include computer science and information technology, finance, engineering, nursing, and health. Music and the visual arts are the most likely to offer a negative return on investment while English literature, philosophy, and psychology can take up to 20 years just to break even. At the same time, graduates with the highest expected income studied chemical engineering, computer engineering, aerospace engineering, electrical engineering, finance, and the life sciences. Prospective employers and state governments have gotten pickier in the collegiate programs they are willing to finance. As of 2023, seven states had passed legislation requiring the disclosure of data on the worth of a university degree, such as students' loan payment and post-graduation employment. Another reason for the decline of interest in the humanities and liberal arts is the fact that many prospective students avoided them for fear of loss of parental support, and the perceived intolerance towards conservatives on college campuses, which tend to be dominated by left-wing faculty members. Although there is no evidence that professors push their students to the political left, a number of radical political movements of the 2010s and 2020s have been promulgated by university alumni who feel aggrieved by the status quo for preventing them achieving the power, influence, and wealth they believe they deserve, thereby destabilizing American society.

In the life sciences, the number of students or researchers interested in a postdoctoral fellowship had plummeted thanks to a boom in the biotechnology industry, which has had an insatiable appetite for talents and is willing to pay much higher than universities. In physics and engineering, which are traditionally male-dominated fields, enrollments had also fallen since 2020, as white men lost interest in higher education. Due to these trends, public universities have trimmed their STEM departments.

Demand for people with Master of Business Administration (MBA) degrees, including graduates of elite business schools, has fallen between the late 2010s and mid-2020s.

During the early 2020s, some employers were hiring graduates directly from high school, offering them generous bonuses, high wages, and (paid) apprenticeship programs in order to offset the ongoing labor shortage. Trade schools and apprenticeship programs have seen significant increases in enrollment while about a third of college graduates, including 38% of recent graduates, worked in jobs that did not require a university degree, according to data from the Federal Reserve Bank of New York. Although the previous Democratic administrations of Bill Clinton and Barack Obama focused on higher education and high-skilled jobs, the Joe Biden government emphasized blue-collar jobs that did not require a college degree, as part of its economic plan to modernize public infrastructure and to rejuvenate the manufacturing sector. Before Biden, President Donald Trump signed a 2017 executive order expanding federal funding for apprenticeship programs which had bipartisan support. In 2022, President Biden announced an initiative aimed at expanding apprenticeship and work-based training programs in K–12 public schools in order to create a competitive and skilled workforce. On the other hand, his multiple attempts to offer student loan relief were defeated by the courts. But as the birth rates of teenagers and the lower classes continues to fall while women with higher incomes and education are having more children, students in the future will be less likely to have to rely on loans.

Ever since it was introduced in the 1960s, affirmative action has been a controversial topic in the United States. In late June 2023, the Supreme Court of the United States ruled against race-based admissions in Students for Fair Admissions v. Harvard and Students for Fair Admissions v. UNC. Schools have also been under pressure to end legacy admissions as well. Total freshman enrollments dropped in the fall semester of 2024, especially among public and private non-profit institutions.

During his second term, President Donald Trump has restricted federal funding for colleges and universities, citing the concerns of critics of higher education. These included rising costs, low value in the workplace, affirmative action (including race-based admissions and diversity, equity, and inclusion (or DEI) programs), what they perceive as antisemitism (especially in the context of how universities handled student protests concerning Israel's War in Gaza), and allegations of hostility towards conservatives as well as the promotion of "woke" culture. Trump is not merely targeting the Ivy League and other prestigious schools, but also public universities, which educated close to three quarters of American college students. His government has terminated some funding programs aimed institutions of higher education serving large numbers of ethnic minorities, which it views as racially discriminatory. Some politicians, such as Trump's Vice President J.D. Vance, even suggested imposing an excise tax on university endowments. Even the wealthiest universities are facing growing financial pressure, forcing them to lay off staff and to issue bonds. As a result of severe funding cuts, large numbers of researchers are considering leaving the country as they now find themselves unable to finance their own research or their students. In late 2025, President Trump terminated the Biden-era pause on student loan repayments; the government will begin garnishing the wages of indebted students the following year. In all, officials in the second Trump administration claim that they want higher education to better prepare alumni for the job market, to curb tuition fees, to limit left-wing political activism, and to defend "the American tradition and Western civilization." It also seeks to curtail Chinese influence in American universities, which have been used to train Chinese communist officials. Republican-controlled states have been implementing similar initiatives in parallel with the federal government aimed at public schools.

Another challenge for higher education is the political zeitgeist of the United States, which has turned against immigration. Since the late twentieth century, the number of foreign students at American institutions of higher education had been rising, especially during 2010s, and was interrupted only by the COVID-19 pandemic. But within months of returning to the White House, President Trump took steps to dramatically cut the number of foreign students at American colleges and universities. As a consequence, the number of new foreign enrollments at American institutions of higher learning fell 17 percent in the fall of 2025. New graduate enrollments dropped six percent. In all, falling demand for higher education in the United States will force this industry to become more innovative, which is something it has not been traditionally good at.

=== Impact of the Coronavirus Pandemic ===
The arrival of COVID-19 in the United States in 2020 merely accelerated many of the previous trends at work. The coronavirus not only wrought havoc on the nation but also caused a severe economic downturn. Consequently, families either delayed or avoided sending their children to institutions of higher education altogether. Undergraduate enrollments dropped even after the return of in-person classes. Worse still for colleges and universities, they had become dependent on foreign students for revenue because they pay full tuition fees and the international restrictions imposed to alleviate the spread of the pandemic meant that this stream of revenue shrank substantially. Several colleges permanently closed their doors by the end of the 2019–20 academic year. Numerous institutions, including elite ones, suspended graduate programs in the humanities and liberal arts due to low student interest and dim employment prospects. Various polls indicated that a growing number of Americans became skeptical of the value of higher education relative to the cost and said they wanted to see K–12 education be less focused on college preparation. Having witnessed the Millennials accumulating large amounts of student debts, members of Generation Z also tended to be more skeptical of the value of higher education and have been more open to alternative educational routes and career options. Young men, especially whites, have increasingly looked elsewhere due to the hostility of identity politics on campus directed towards them. Meanwhile, the number of women's colleges continued to fall, following a decades-long trend. But community colleges have fared the worst of all, losing 37% of enrollments between 2010 and 2023. Prospective students have been shunning them in large numbers due to the low quality of education and student services. As of 2024, American institutions of higher learning were closing at a rate of one per week.

In the aftermath of the COVID-19 pandemic, colleges and universities saw an increase in the number of faculty members leaving academia, citing low pay, stressful work environments, heavy workloads, lack of administrative support, and occupational burnout as reasons for their decisions. Non-tenure track professors now make up three-quarters of college faculty, up from a quarter in 1975. Moreover, lecturers and professors in the humanities face a highly precarious job market. Graduates who majored in the humanities and the liberal arts in the 2010s were most likely to regret having done so and had lower expected incomes than their counterparts in STEM.

Between the early 2000s and the late 2010s, the number of students from emerging economies going abroad for higher education increased, and the United States was the most popular destination for international students, many of whom were from mainland China. The United States was the single most popular destination for Chinese students; among children of the Chinese ruling class ("princelings"), attending elite institutions in the United States was commonplace and seen as a status symbol, but the deterioration in the bilateral relationship as exemplified by President Donald Trump's entry restrictions on Chinese students in addition to the travel complications produced by the COVID-19 pandemic reduced the number of Chinese students enrolling in many American colleges and universities.

Foreign enrollments rebounded post-pandemic, with a surge of students coming from India and sub-Saharan Africa. Nevertheless, dependency on foreign students threatened the future of many American schools, which have hitherto been assuming that the number of international applicants would keep growing. As mentioned above, this no longer holds during the second Trump administration.

== Controversy ==
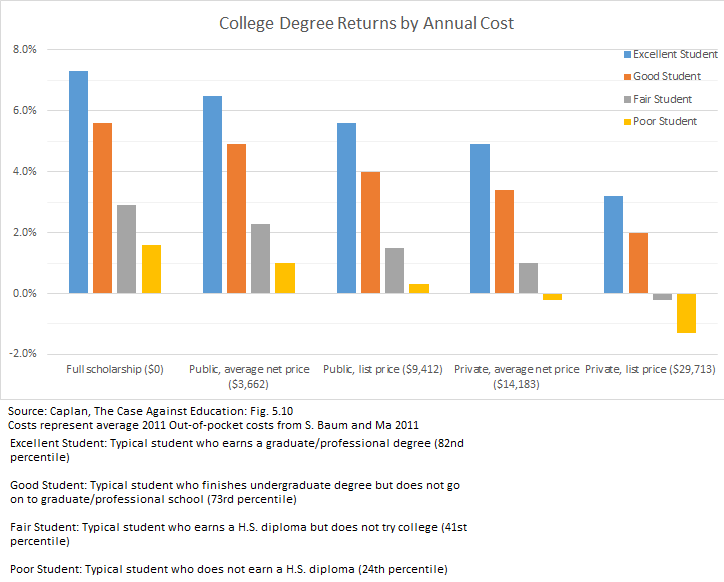
College Degree Returns by Average 2011 Annual Out-of-Pocket Costs, from B. Caplan's The Case Against Education

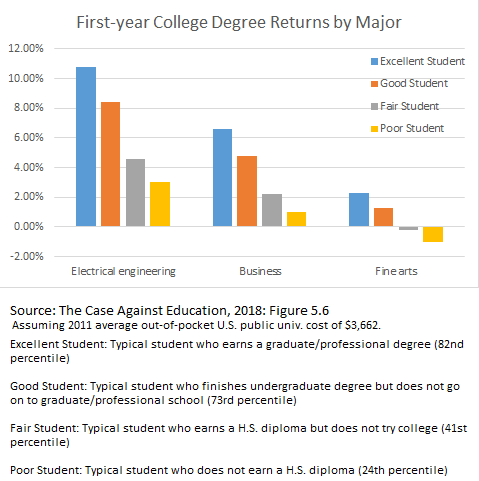
First-year U.S. college degree returns for select majors, by type of student, 2011

A study comparing college revenue per student by tuition and state funding in 2008 dollars.

The view that higher education is a bubble is debated. Some economists do not think that returns to a college education are falling but instead believe that the benefits far outweigh the costs. Others argue that survival bias is not accounted for, given those who dropped out did not receive a degree but may have student loans to pay off, and that the benefits are only for those who graduate.

As of 2012, 29% of student debtors never graduated, and those who did could take decades to pay back the money they owed. Also, the returns for marginal students or students in certain majors, especially at costly private universities, may not justify the investment. It has been suggested that the returns to education should be compared to the returns to other forms of investment such as the stock market, bonds, real estate, and private equity. A higher return would suggest underinvestment in higher education, but lower returns would suggest a bubble. Studies have typically found a causal relationship between growth and education, although the quality and type of education matters, and not just the number of years of schooling.

In a financial bubble, assets like houses are sometimes purchased with a view to reselling at a higher price, and this can produce rapidly escalating prices as people speculate on future prices. An end to the spiral can provoke abrupt selling of the assets, resulting in an abrupt collapse in price – the bursting of the bubble. Because the asset acquired through college attendance – a higher education – cannot be sold but only rented through wages, there is no similar mechanism that would cause an abrupt collapse in the value of existing degrees. For this reason, this analogy could be misleading.

One rebuttal to the claims that a bubble analogy is misleading is the observation that the 'bursting' of the bubble are the negative effects on students who incur student debt, for example, as the American Association of State Colleges and Universities reports that "Students are deeper in debt today than ever before.... The trend of heavy debt burdens threatens to limit access to higher education, particularly for low-income and first-generation students, who tend to carry the heaviest debt burden. Federal student aid policy has steadily put resources into student loan programs rather than need-based grants, a trend that straps future generations with high debt burdens. Even students who receive federal grant aid are finding it more difficult to pay for college."

However, the data actually show that notwithstanding a slight increase in 2008–2009, student loan default rates have declined since the mid-1980s and 1990s. During both periods of growth and recession, those with college degrees are much less likely than those without to be unemployed, even though they earn higher wages.

Ohio University economist Richard Vedder has written in The Wall Street Journal that:

A key measure of the benefits of a degree is the college graduate's earning potential – and on this score, their advantage over high-school graduates is deteriorating. Since 2006, the gap between what the median college graduate earned compared with the median high-school graduate has narrowed by $1,387 for men over 25 working full time, a 5% fall. Women in the same category have fared worse, losing 7% of their income advantage ($1,496). A college degree's declining value is even more pronounced for younger Americans. According to data collected by the College Board, for those in the 25–34 age range, the differential between college graduate and high school graduate earnings fell 11% for men, to $18,303 from $20,623. The decline for women was an extraordinary 19.7%, to $14,868 from $18,525. Meanwhile, the cost of college has increased 16.5% in 2012 dollars since 2006, according to the Bureau of Labor Statistics' higher education tuition-fee index.

=== Alternatives to bubble hypothesis ===
A different explanation for rising tuition is the reduction of state and federal appropriations to colleges, making them more reliant on student tuition. Thus, it is not a bubble but a form of shifting costs away from state and federal funding over to students. This has mostly applied to public universities which in 2011 for the first time have taken in more in tuition than in state funding and had the greatest increases in tuition. Implied from this shift away from public funding to tuition is privatization, although The New York Times reported that such claims are exaggerated.

A second hypothesis claims that as a result of federal law that severely restricts the ability of students to discharge their federally guaranteed student loans in bankruptcy, lenders and colleges know that students are on the hook for any amount that they borrow, including late fees and interest (which can be capitalized and increase the principal loan amount), thus removing the incentive to only provide students loans that the students can be reasonably expected to repay.

As evidence for this hypothesis, it has been suggested that returning bankruptcy protections (and other standard consumer protections) to student loans would cause lenders to be more cautious, thereby causing a sharp decline in the availability of student loans, which, in turn, would decrease the influx of dollars to colleges and universities, who, in turn, would have to sharply decrease tuition to match the lower availability of funds.

Economic and social commentator Gary North has remarked at LewRockwell.com, "To speak of college as a bubble is silly. A bubble does not pop until months or years after the funding ceases. There is no indication that the funding for college education will cease."

Azar Nafisi, Johns Hopkins University professor and bestselling author of Reading Lolita in Tehran, has stated on the PBS NewsHour that a purely economic analysis of a higher education bubble is incomplete:

Universities become sort of like canaries in the mine for a culture. They become the sort of standard of where culture is going. The dynamism, the originality of these entrepreneurial experiences, the fact that society allows people to be original, to take risks, all of it comes from a passionate love of knowledge. And universities represent all the different areas and fields within a society. And the students and faculty come from all these fields. This is a community that represents the best that a society has to offer. And there was a mention of our universities being the best in the world.

== See also ==
- College admissions in the United States
- College tuition in the United States
- Credentialism
- Economic bubble
- EdFund
- Free education
- Higher Education Price Index
- Higher education problems in China
- Higher education problems in South Korea
- Neijuan
- 2021 Laurentian University financial crisis in Canada
