= Student loans in South Korea =

Student loans in South Korea, are student loans provided to South Korea's students that are managed by the Korea Student Aid Foundation (KOSAF) which was established in May 2009. According to the governmental philosophy that Korea's future depends on talent development and no student should quit studying due to financial reasons, they help students grow into talents that serve the nation and society as members of Korea. Through the management of Korea's national scholarship programs, student loan programs, and talent development programs, KOSAF offers customized student aid services and student loan program is one of their major tasks.

== Main Loan Programs ==
=== Income Contingent Loan ===
For undergraduate students of all grades from low-income households in the 1st through 7th income bracket levels; also, for students (irrespective of income level) from households with three or more children—beginning with the third child. Strong academic performance is part of the eligibility criteria. Loans are not subject to credit approval. Loan applicants must be enrolled for undergraduate study in a postsecondary institution in Korea. Students do not qualify for this loan program if they are in a graduate school, a continuing education program through an academic credit bank system, or a school outside of Korea. Loan must be used for tuition, qualifying school fees, and other specific education-related costs, including living expenses during study. Loan payments may not exceed the student's financial need; there is no other upper limit on the amount borrowed (loan program permits full coverage of tuition and expenses). In the case of applying loan towards both tuition/school fees and in-study living expenses, the lower limit is KRW 600,000 (at least KRW 100,000 for tuition/school fees plus at least KRW 500,000 for living expenses). Under the income contingent repayment system, borrowers do not have to pay the loan principal amount or interest until their income is above a certain minimum threshold level for repayment. Once the borrower's annual income is greater than the repayment minimum threshold level, the borrower is under obligation to begin repayment.

=== Direct Loan (DL) ===
Reduced-interest loans that come from and are guaranteed by the government. Qualifying borrowers, on certain conditions, may be eligible for interest relief offered by the government. For undergraduate and graduate students of any grade level*, from households of any income level. Loan applicants must be enrolled for undergraduate study in a postsecondary institution in Korea. Students do not qualify for this loan program if they are in a continuing education program through an academic credit bank system or a school outside of Korea. Satisfactory academic performance is part of the eligibility criteria. Loans are subject to credit approval. Loan must be used for tuition, qualifying school fees, and other specific education-related costs, including living expenses during study. Loan payments may not exceed the student's financial need. Depending on the type of school (i.e. undergraduate, graduate), the upper limit on the amount borrowed ranges from KRW 40 million to KRW 90 million. If applying loan towards both tuition/school fees and in-study living expenses, the lower limit is KRW 600,000 (at least KRW 100,000 for tuition/school fees plus at least KRW 500,000 for living expenses). The repayment system offers a borrower grace period of 10 years or less during which payments only need to be made towards the interest on the loan. This maximum period of time is determined by the borrower's year in school and the remaining number of years within the standard period of the borrower's program. After the grace period, the borrower is given up to 10 years in which to repay the loan principal amount and interest. The repayment period is dependent upon the borrower.

- For undergraduate students in the 1st semester of the 1st year who apply for this loan, only credit is considered when making approvals for loans.

=== Loan for Rural Students (LRS) ===
No-interest loans that come from and are guaranteed by the government. Highlights the customized aspect of the student loans provided through KOSAF. For undergraduate students of all grades and any income level whose parents and guardians have lived at a permanent address in an agriculture and fisheries community area for more than 6 months (180 days) and/or students who have been making a living in the agriculture and fisheries industry for more than 6 months. Students from households with more than three children may be given priority. Loan applicants must be enrolled for undergraduate study in a postsecondary institution in Korea. Students do not qualify for this loan program if they are in a graduate school, a remote (off-campus)/distance learning program, a continuing education program through an academic credit bank system, or a school outside of Korea. Satisfactory academic performance is part of the eligibility criteria. Loan must be used for tuition and qualifying school fees (not including living expenses). Offers full coverage of tuition and qualifying school fees. Loan payments may not exceed the student's financial need.

== Variations ==
=== Living Expenses Loan ===
For undergraduate students whose income level qualifies them for the Income Contingent (Deun-Deun) Student Loan (ICL) and/or the Standard Student Loan (SL) and for graduate students (through the SL). For 1st- or 2nd-year undergraduates, the same academic and income level qualifications for the ICL apply; for 3rd- or 4th-year undergraduates, the academic and income level qualifications for the ICL and the SL apply. Loan must be used for necessary non-tuition, living expenses during the academic year that may include room and board, books and supplies, and transportation costs. The student may determine the amount to borrow in increments of KRW 100,000—from KRW 500,000 to KRW 1 million per semester (or up to KRW 2 million per school year). May receive loan on its own or in combination with a student loan (for school tuition and fees).

=== KOSAF Loan Conversion Program ===
For undergraduate and graduate students whose academic and income levels qualify them for the Income Contingent Loan (ICL). Students receiving the Direct Loan (DL) who qualify for the ICL may be eligible to shift from the DL to the ICL. The transition only applies from the school semester during which the loan approval is made. For all previous semesters during which the borrower received the DL, the terms and conditions of the DL fully apply (e.g. the interest accrued on the loan principal each month while the borrower was receiving the DL must be repaid).

== Current situation ==
About 750,000 students borrowed about 2.7 trillion KRW in 2011. KOSAF seeks lower interest rates by issuing direct loans. Since KOSAF issue government-guaranteed bonds, students can borrow directly from the foundation, which reduces their burden on tuition payment.

Only three out of 10 college graduates who applied for the Deun Deun Student Loan manage to earn enough money to pay back the government according to the Korean Student Aid Foundation (KOSAF).

== See also ==
- Student benefit
- Student debt
