= In-state tuition for undocumented Utah students =

2002 Utah state law

Exemption from Nonresident Tuition
- Long title: Modification to Utah State Code - Resident Tuition - Requirements - Rules - 53B - 8 - 106
- Enacted by: the Utah State Legislature United States Congress
- Effective: July 1, 2002

Citations
- Public law: Pub.L H.B.144

Legislative history
- Introduced in the Utah State House of Representatives

In 2002, Utah legislature passed a law that effectively changed the Utah state code, extending higher education in-state tuition to undocumented immigrants living and attending high school in Utah. The bill was presented in the 2002 general session of the Utah Legislature, and passed in the same session.

According to the state code there are three main requirements to qualify for the in-state tuition: attending a Utah high school for three or more years, graduating or receiving an equivalent certification from a school in Utah, and being willing to file an application for lawful immigration status as soon as they are eligible to do so . There have been multiple attempts to repeal the alteration but each attempt has failed.

In 2019 immigrants made up 8.4% of the population, and as a result of this state code 13% of college students were undocumented immigrants. There have been movements to expand the rights of undocumented immigrants beyond the limits of the state code, including a push for the ability to practice law in Utah.

== Background ==
To understand the rapidity with which Utah altered the code on undocumented immigrants, it is important to understand the history of migration in the country. As Utah started out as a territory largely inhabited by people belonging to the Church of Jesus Christ of Latter Day Saints, there was a high rate of immigration into the territory, especially coming from Britain and the British Isles. By 1870 there had been 28,063 immigrants to the Utah territory who had come via church sponsored parties, making up more than a quarter of the total population of the territory. This history of high immigration rates previous to statehood continued to occur, and more people from increasingly diverse areas emigrated to Utah for religious solidarity.

The larger immigrant population, however, is that of Latinos. Utah was a frontier state, and in the late 1800s the development of cattle, ranching, and mining industries brought many Latinos to Utah from their homes in New Mexico and Arizona. Since there was more space in the Utah territory, many of the migrant workers relocated to Utah permanently. Utah also had a stronger economy than other territories and states at the time, and presented a greater amount of economic stability. With the outbreak of World War II in the 1940s, Latinos from New Mexico and Colorado were recruited to assist in the defense effort in Utah, and many chose to participate and move to Utah because of the higher pay offered. In 2000 the Latino population in Utah was 9.0% of the total population in Utah and by 2010 their population grew by 78%, making up 16% of the total population. The 9.0% represents 201,559 out of 2,233,169 and the 16% represents 358,340 out of 2,763,885. Latinos on average have a high birthrate, comparable to the birthrate of Utah women. Due to the high birth levels Utah Legislation has called for higher security over groups that illegally enter Utah, but that has not stopped many from coming over during the time it has been enforced.

== Provisions ==
This 2002 house bill stipulates that high school graduates with undocumented status can pay in-state tuition, as long as they qualify under certain regulations. According to the language of the actual code, the candidate must have attended a Utah high school for three or more years, graduated or received an equivalent certification from a school in Utah, and wait until after the 2002–3 school year to register as a participating student. It is also mandated that the applicant file an affidavit with the institution of higher education stating they have filed or are willing to file an application for lawful immigration status and soon as they are eligible to do so, and gives the universities freedom to determine if an applicant fulfills all of these stipulations.

The Utah requirements for this law are on par with the requirements of other states who have passed laws along the same lines, with California, Illinois, Kansas, Nebraska, Texas, and Washington all requiring undocumented immigrant students to attend three years of an in-state high school and graduate/earn a degree to be eligible for the grant. Out of the fourteen states that have full-coverage policies like this, Utah is one of 6 that does not currently allow undocumented immigrants to qualify for further in-state financial aid. Many people from this socioeconomic class have limited access to state and federal financial aid, and the subsidizing of state colleges by the government is a huge advantage that many take advantage of.

The need for state subsidizing of tuition and the ability of the state to provide such compensation differs largely by geographic location. In states with increasing graduation rates it is more likely they will not have the funds nor enough universities to fill the demand for higher education. In states with decreasing graduation rates, however, providing greater availability of higher education to undocumented students gives the state a higher chance of filling their universities to capacity. In the case of Utah, the graduation rates were decreasing, allowing them more opportunity to fill their universities by adjusting the state code and affording undocumented immigrants the chance to gain in-state tuition.

== Implementation ==
The seal of the governor of Utah, who had to approve the code change

This state code alteration works in practice by helping immigrants receive an education that would otherwise be unavailable. There are policies that generally produce a conflicting set of identities because of the possibility of receiving a higher education, due to the fact that without the adjustment to the education code, undocumented immigrants would have little chance at scholarly advancement. They still have to work around obstacles to receive a higher education, however, and many do everything possible to get the education desired. It is up to a university's admissions services to determine whether or not the individual has completed all the requirements, and as such is subject to some bias within the admissions office.

When immigrants move to a new country it is typically due to a hope of economic betterment or religious beliefs. When immigrants come and receive American higher education they can help out the economy in the long run. If they obtain legal immigration status and decide to stay in the United States with a job obtained through their degree, then they earn an income, pay taxes, and spend that income, helping the economy to grow. Giving undocumented students in-state tuition has been effective because once it became law it was easier for those students to receive the education they desired. Opposition to the policy contends that there is no reason for promoting a college education for the students since they are unable to legally work in the U.S., and that gaining citizenship is unlikely as they would have to return to their birth country and pay thousands of dollars in processing fees. As the policy is still intact 18 years later, it has resisted the attempts to repeal it, and continues to provide in-state resident tuition to undocumented students.

== Legislative history ==
Texas was the first to pass a law granting in-state tuition for qualifying undocumented immigrants, with California following suit, both in 2001. The Utah law was then passed in 2002, along with a similar law in New York that same year. Because of the large immigrant population (almost 8% first generation, and another 8% second generation), the Utah legislature was quick to alter the code that would open educational doors for the children of undocumented immigrants. Much of the motive behind the change in the state code was to increase motivation for Latino kids in high school. With no prospect of college, most undocumented immigrants children would give up on their education very early into high school. Because of this apathy, educators met with politicians to provide opportunities to attend college and increase the motivation among their students. Not all states have these policies, however. Alaska and Mississippi have passed legislation that actively forbids undocumented immigrants from receiving in-state tuition, and Arizona, Colorado, North Carolina, Virginia, and Utah have all considered passing legislation that would repeal their previous in-state tuition laws.

Only two years after the law was passed in 2002, a bill was proposed that would end the policy of in-state tuition for undocumented immigrants, on the grounds that it was based on an upcoming federal statute that had not passed congress. The bill was not voted on, so it failed to be made into law and the previous policy on in-state tuition was upheld. The change in code was again challenged in 2007 when a repeal was proposed. 55% of Utah state voters responded in a poll that they would like the law repealed, since they felt it rewarded illegal activities. Many argued that without legal immigration status the immigrants could not be hired for jobs in the United States, and that a college education would therefore be pointless. The repeal failed, however, and the change to the state code remained effective.

== Results ==
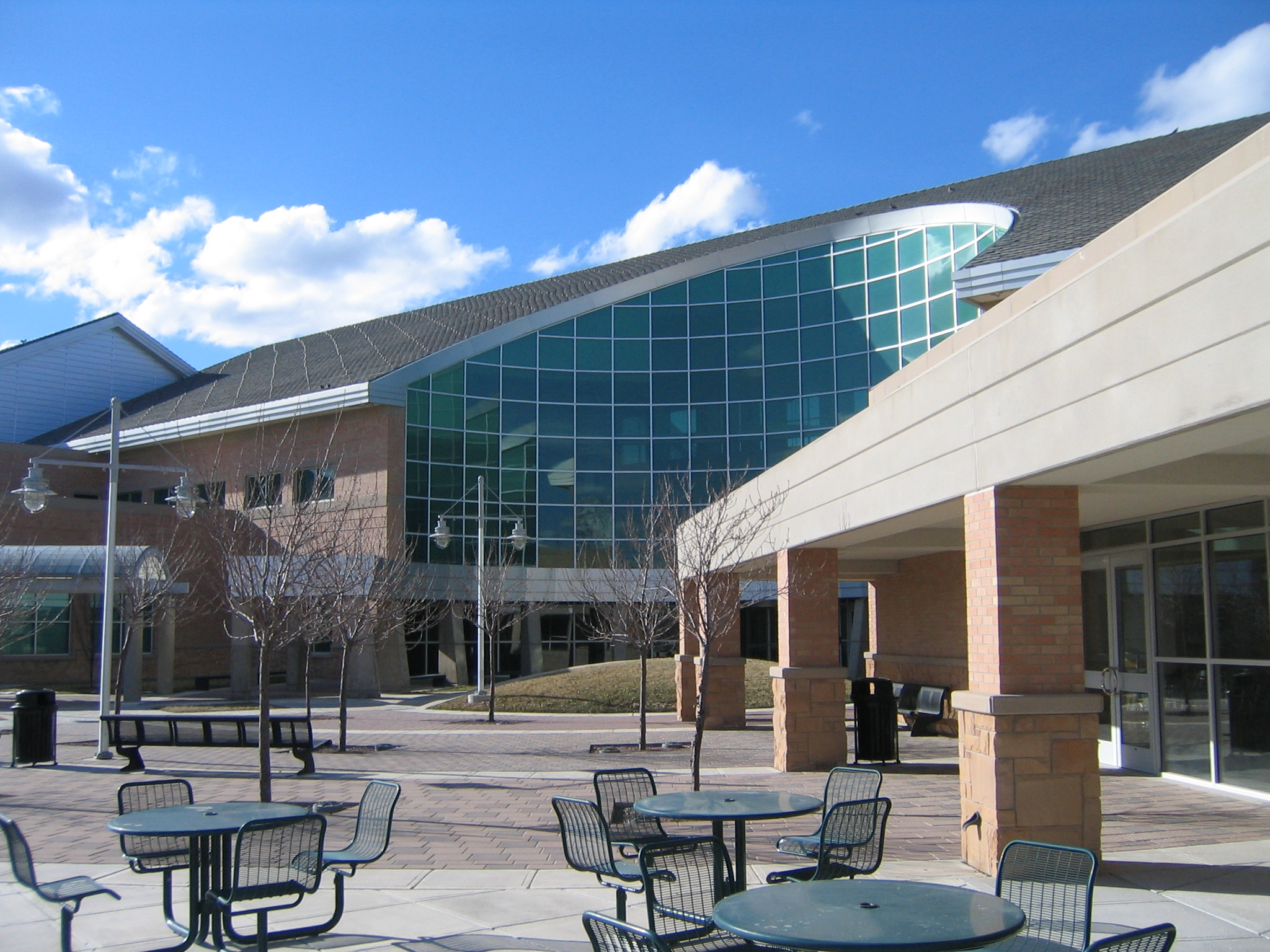
The DREAM center at Salt Lake Community College, that helps kids plan their future and figure out their options

Since undocumented immigrant students typically come from low income families, the law passed increases the number of these students gaining a higher education drastically. There are those who choose not to take advantage of the benefit, however, because there is still a cost involved, even if it is subsidized by the government. For some immigrant children, the return on investment as a result of college is outweighed by the immediate cost of attending. Despite this, however, the 2002 law passed in Utah has made college a viable option for many undocumented students. The nationwide average of undocumented immigrants in high school who attend college is 5-10%, and Utah along with other states implementing in-state resident tuition policies are at the higher end of this percentage, and often exceed it. In 2019, 13% of all Utah college students were undocumented students who applied for in-state tuition through the resident college tuition waiver.

The immigrants who take advantage of this, however, can develop an identity complex as a result of the legislation. While they are residents in the state, their place as an undocumented immigrant leads to its own set of legislation, using words such as ‘alien’, ‘minor’, and ‘undocumented student’. It sets them apart as different than typical students, and makes them an outcome of policy instead of the reason for a policy.

The 2002 change in state code has had a long-term effect on Utah politics, as undocumented immigrants are granted increasing rights in the state of Utah. It has led to the development of a DREAM center at Salt Lake Community College, at which the students can learn about the options they have and how to pursue a future in America. It has also led to a fight for greater rights for undocumented immigrants, seen in the push to allow them to take the BAR exam and practice law in the state of Utah.
