= Student financial aid in Finland =

Assistance for paying for education in Finland

Student financial aid in Finland consists of government payments (through Kela) that provide economic security to students and enable all students to study. Almost all Finnish students receive financial aid, including foreigners who are permanent residents or EU citizens. It is available in the form of:

- a study grant
- a government-backed student loan
- a housing supplement (starting 1 August 2017, available only to those who are studying abroad or enrolled in a tuition-based programme at a folk high school or sports institute and living in the school dormitory).
  - students are eligible for general housing benefits

The qualifying conditions for student financial aid are:

- admission to a school
- full-time study
- academic progress
- need of financial assistance.

They are a kind of transfer payment. Similar systems, some of which are older, exist in some other countries where education is free of charge, e.g. Germany and Sweden. Student benefit is paid by the state to all qualifying students, excluding only those with full-time employment and income, and is thus distinct from an individually evaluated scholarship.

In addition, Finnish students enjoy several kinds of student benefits such as:

- Partially state-funded meals at student cafeterias.

== Details ==
Secondary and tertiary education is free of charge in Finland. Monetary support is paid by the government agency KELA. Most student financial aid is paid to students in tertiary education, but smaller amounts are available also on the secondary level. Student benefits are independent of parents' income in tertiary education for students over the age of 20 who live alone. In tertiary education, students in bachelor's and master's programmes qualify for financial aid. Only those months spent actively studying are supported; i.e. in summer, benefits cease unless a special summer studying plan is submitted and followed.

For students in tertiary education, the figures are as follows. Direct monetary support for students over the age of 20 who live alone is €303.19 per month for those who have started their studies before autumn 2014 and €336.76 for people starting their education in autumn 2014 or later. Rent support is 80% of rent or maximum €201.60. The state or the universities generally do not provide student accommodation. Dormitories are usually run by foundations and student unions, and cannot accommodate all students. The state secures student loans (from private banks) for up to €400 per month. Student meals are supported by €1.94 per meal and available for example on (privately operated) student cafeterias on campus, thus the effective price is about €2-3.

Persistent failure to progress in studies ultimately leads to the termination of student benefits. Likewise, when evaluated on a yearly basis, income of over €660 per month on supported months and over €1,970 per month on unsupported months reduces the student benefit. Typically, nine months are supported and three summer months are not, which gives a maximum annual income of €11,850.

The benefits were raised in 2008 and 2014: in 2008 the direct support was increased by 15% and the income limits were raised by 30%; in August 2014 the direct support was raised by approx. 1.3% for those already studying and 11% larger for those starting their studies in 2014 accompanied by a 5-month decrease in the period of financial aid and a €100 increase in the student loan security. Despite this, students often find the benefit insufficient, thus working while studying or spending the entire summer at summer jobs is popular. Student loans are less popular than elsewhere.

In year 2019 each Finnish student had approximately 8,200 euros in student debt.

Student benefits are available to Finnish citizens. They are not available for students entering the country for the sole purpose of studying.

== See also ==
- College tuition in the United States
- EdFund
- Post-secondary education
- Private university
- Student debt
- Student loan
- Student loans in Germany
- Student loans in the United States
- Tuition fees
