= BAföG =

Student financial aid law in Germany

The Bundesausbildungsförderungsgesetz (German pronunciation: [bʊndəsʔaʊsbɪldʊŋsˈfœʁdəʁʊŋsɡəˌzɛts], lit. 'Federal Training Assistance Act'), mostly known by its abbreviation BAföG or Bafög (German pronunciation: [ˈbaːfœk]), is Germany's Federal Training Assistance Act for students who attend secondary schools and universities. Since its introduction in 1971, the BAföG Act has regulated all available federal student grants and loans in Germany. Students who receive financial assistance under this law often refer to it as "receiving BAföG". In 2016, 18% of all students in Germany received financial support from BAföG.

== See also ==
- Student loan
