= Tuition freeze =

Tuition freeze is a government policy restricting the ability of administrators of post-secondary educational facilities (i.e. colleges and universities) to increase tuition fees for students. Although governments have various reasons for implementing such a policy, the main reason cited is improving accessibility for working- and middle-class students. A tuition fee freeze is a common political goal of the Canadian student movement, especially the Canadian Federation of Students.

A tuition freeze is best known as a Canadian political construct, and can accurately be applied only to other countries that offer post-secondary education at a cost. However, the practice of regulating the rates paid by consumers, a formal regulatory process known as utility ratemaking, is carried out in many countries, including the United States, where many industries are classified as public utilities. Although the classification of public utilities has changed over time, typically such businesses must constitute a de facto monopoly (or "natural monopoly") for the services they provide within a particular jurisdiction. Since a monopoly exists when a specific person or enterprise is the only supplier of a particular commodity, it can be argued that colleges are an enterprise, or group of businesses that have sole access to a market of higher education, as they are the only supplier of a college degree, and are thus comparable to the monopoly of a group electric companies, who are the sole supplier of electricity.

In Canada, where government regulation of college tuition is practiced, it is applied (currently) at the provincial level, as education (including post-secondary education) is a provincial responsibility under the division of powers between provincial and federal governments. Currently, the provinces of Alberta, Manitoba, Quebec, Saskatchewan, and Newfoundland have tuition fee freezes in place. The provinces of British Columbia and Ontario have previously had tuition fee freezes.

== See also ==
- College tuition in the United States
- EdFund
- Free education
- Higher Education Price Index
- Price controls
- Private university
- Student debt
- Student loan
- Student loans in the United States
- Tertiary education
- Tuition payments
