= Student debt =

Debt used to finance post-secondary education or higher degrees

Student debt refers to the debt incurred by an individual to pay for education-related expenses. This debt is most commonly assumed to pay for tertiary education, such as university.

The amount loaned or the loan agreement is often referred to as a student loan. In many countries, student loans work differently compared to mortgages with differing laws governing renegotiation and bankruptcy. As with most other types of debt, student debt may be considered defaulted after a given period of no response to requests by the school or the lender for information, payment, or negotiation. Afterward, the debt is turned over to a student loan guarantor or a collection agency.

== Canada ==
As of 2018, Canada is ranked third in the world (behind Russia and South Korea) for the percentage of people ages 25–34 who have completed tertiary education. As of September 2012, the average debt for a Canadian post-university student was 28,000 Canadian dollars, with this accumulated debt taking an average of 14 years to fully repay based on an average starting salary of $39,523. To assist low-income citizens with student debt, Canada's Interest Relief program offers a six-month reprieve from mandatory payments for up to a total of 30 months, during which the government covers interest, preventing the loan amount from increasing further. Students are relieved of their debt after 15 years. As a whole, Canadians accumulated over $15 billion in 2010, rising to about $18.2 billion in 2017 (both figures are only on government-backed loans). In 2018, however, the total student debt (for both government and private sponsored loans) was $28 billion. In 2023, the Federal Government permanently suspended the accumulation of interest on Canada Student Loans and Canada Apprentice Loans under the Canada Student Financial Assistance Program.

== Chile ==
In 2014, a Chilean activist, artist Francisco Tapia, known as "Papas Fritas" (French Fries), "Burned $500 million worth of debt papers" from Viña del Mar University and displayed the ashes in a van as an art project. The university was being shut down due to financial irregularities. "It is a concrete fact that the papers were burned. They are gone, burned completely, and there's no debt," said Papas Fritas in his first U.S. broadcast interview. "Since these papers don't exist anymore, there's no way to charge the students."

== Denmark ==
There are no tuition fees for Danish and EU students in Denmark. Students in Denmark also receive student grants from the government to enroll in an institution of higher education. Every Dane over the age of 18 is entitled to this public support if they decide to further their education. The scheme and the conditions for grants and loans are different if they are a foreign citizen. However, financial support is still available if the applicant is from an EU member state. Apart from the public support, there are many corporate-sponsored scholarships for international students with different requirements.

== Finland ==
For students from Switzerland, the EU, or the EEA, there is no tuition fee for students studying at Finnish universities. There are, however, many exemptions for non-Finnish citizens studying at a Finnish university to not pay tuition as well. In addition to going to college for free, students also receive student grants from the government. These grants are generally used for housing and compensate for up to 80% of rent for students who live independently and are not qualified to receive child benefits. Through Kela, 40% of students take out student loans in addition to student grants. Student loans average about €650 a month for higher education within Finland and an average amount of €800 a month for Finnish students studying abroad. These loans are not through Kela itself but are guaranteed loans through the student's bank of choice. Besides student loans and grants, Finland also compensates its citizens and others who qualify with a meal subsidy, school transport subsidy, and a student loan compensation for students who finish schooling in a target time.

In August 2017, Finland saw student loan drawdowns double to €143 million from August 2016 as a result of being able to borrow €650 a month from the previous €400 a month. The reform for financial aid resulted in students who qualify for government-guaranteed loans increasing by over 60%.

== France ==
The average tuition fees for a bachelor's degree in France amount to around €190 a year, approximately €620 a year for engineering degrees, around €260 a year for a master's degree, and around €400 a year for a PhD. These fee structures are similar to those in Germany. Housing, transportation, and health insurance costs are not included in the tuition fees. Students can take out loans to pay for these expenses. However, less than 2% of students take out loans, as there is financial assistance available to pay for the full tuition or half of the tuition for low-income families, depending on their needs.

== Germany ==
Germany has both private and public universities, with the majority being public universities, which is part of the reason their graduates do not have as much debt. For undergraduate studies, public universities are free. However, they have an enrollment fee of no more than €250 per year, which is roughly US$270. Private universities, on the other hand, have an average tuition cost of €10,000 per semester, which is about US$10,700. Private universities account for 7.1% of total enrollment, with the rest attending public universities. The only expense students take out loans for in public universities is the living cost, which ranges from €3,600 to €8,200 a year, depending on the university location. However, the repayment of this loan is interest-free, and no borrower pays more than €10,000, regardless of the borrowed amount. In 2005, the average debt at graduation was €5,600, which is around US$6,000. The chance to gain a bachelor's through well-respected universities at a reasonable price without interest-packed loans attracts many foreign students, as seen through increased enrollment of students from all around the world.

== United Kingdom ==
Followed closely by the United States, the United Kingdom has some of the highest rates of student debt. The growth of these student debt rates over the last 50 years has largely been attributed to the government's desire to increase student participation in higher education. Now, the UK has adopted a plan based on "Income Contingent Loans" to allow students to pay back loans at a rate proportional to their level of income post-graduation.

There is concern about possible changes in government policy forcing graduates to pay back more. The Institute for Fiscal Studies claims that 75% of graduates will never repay all their debts. According to economist Sebastian Burnside, student debt is the fastest-growing type of borrowing and is rapidly becoming economically significant.

In 2015, Central Saint Martins student Brooke Purvis announced that he would burn his student loan as a form of protest art, raising awareness about student debt. It is argued that the artwork addresses the subject matter of the materialism of money and brings to light the political issues of the U.K student loan system.

== United States ==
In 2023, the typical federal student loan borrower owed nearly $40,000 and there were approximately 45 million student loan borrowers. Only mortgage debt is greater than student loan debt in the United States.

=== History ===
Some scholars attribute the student debt crisis to the influence of neoliberal policies and practices, which have bolstered tuition costs while simultaneously reducing state funding for higher education.

During the Reagan presidency student debt increased, and following the Great Recession climbed significantly as states slashed public funding for higher education. By comparison, as late as the 1960s, student debt did not significantly impact American life.

=== Social and political reactions ===
A February 2018 research paper from the Levy Economics Institute of Bard College argues that government cancellation student debt in the United States would result in rising consumer demand, along with economic growth and increased employment. Over the following decade, the GDP would increase by between $86 billion and $108 billion annually, which would result in an increase of between 1.2 and 1.5 million jobs and a decreased unemployment rate of 0.22 to 0.36 percent.

According to a Hill-HarrisX poll, 58% of registered voters are in favor of making public colleges tuition free and also support abolishing all outstanding student loan debt.

It was revealed in September 2019 that the U.S. Army is using the student debt crisis to boost recruitment, moreso than the ongoing conflicts it is engaged in, and because of this exceeded its recruitment goals. The Head of Army Recruiting Command, Maj. Gen. Frank Muth, said that "One of the national crises right now is student loans, so $31,000 is [about] the average. They can get out [of the Army] after four years, 100 percent paid for state college anywhere in the United States."

In a video report from libertarian Reason magazine, analyst Emma Camp assessed the impact of outright debt forgiveness and concluded that inequities exist in abolishing all student debt outright as opposed to allowing individuals most in dire need to declare bankruptcy and relieve themselves of student debts that they find themselves to be unable to pay back. Camp argues that wholesale debt forgiveness would instead exacerbate inflation and worsen the economy in the United States in particular, or anywhere that such indiscriminate debt forgiveness were to take place.

In April 2024, the Biden administration initiated the forgiveness of $7.4 billion in student loan debt for 277,000 borrowers, as part of its broader strategy to address the issue. This action added to the $153 billion already forgiven for nearly 4.3 million individuals, reflecting the administration's ongoing efforts in tackling student loan debt.

== See also ==
- College admissions in the United States
- College tuition in the United States
- Debt relief
- EdFund
- Free education
- Higher education bubble in the United States
- Higher Education Price Index
- Post-secondary education
- Private university
- Student benefit
- Student loan
- Tuition
- Tuition agency
- Tuition center
- Tuition fees
- Tuition freeze
- Refinancing
