= College tuition in the United States =

Aspect of American higher education

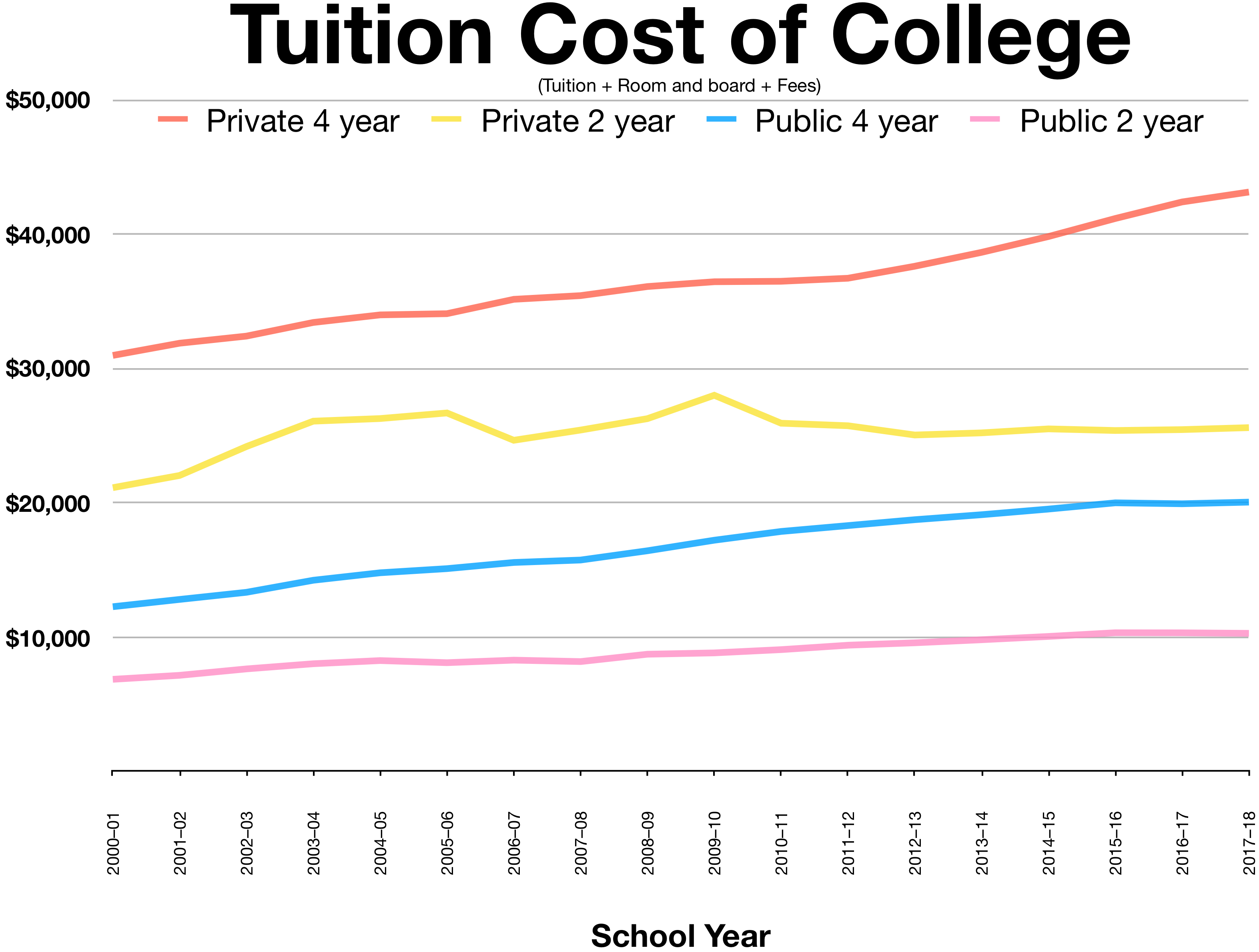
Tuition cost of college

College tuition in the United States is the cost of higher education collected by educational institutions in the United States, and paid by individuals. It does not include the tuition covered through general taxes or from other government funds, or that which is paid from university endowment funds or gifts. Tuition for college has increased as the value, quality, and quantity of education have increased. Many feel that increases in cost have not been accompanied by increases in quality, and that administrative costs are excessive. The value of a college education has become a topic of national debate in the U.S.

== History ==
Under the Tenth Amendment to the United States Constitution, the powers of the federal government are limited to those mentioned explicitly in the Constitution. As education is not mentioned, educational policy and schools are state matters in the United States. The federal government operates military academies, but there is no national university nor national academic standards. The development of national standards has been driven from outside, especially the accounting industry, as more and more money became involved.

An important predecessor was the Morrill Act of 1862, which provided for land-grant colleges using surplus federal lands recently acquired.

The size and cost of U.S. public higher education increased dramatically after World War II with the introduction of the G.I. Bill and greater federal funding for higher education. Policy makers believed that university-based research had played a critical role in determining the outcome of World War II and would be essential for success in the Cold War. With the launch of the Sputnik satellite by the Soviet Union, many feared that the United States was falling behind on science and technology because it relied on private wealth to fund higher education, in contrast to the Soviet system, which was publicly funded and perceived by some to be more meritocratic and more closely tied to the needs of the economy and the military. In the United States, many families were unable to borrow sufficient funds to finance a high-quality education for their children, and to thereby increase their children's earning capacity and standard of living, until after the introduction of federal student loans. As public subsidies fell and costs and quality of education increased, loans played an increasingly important role in higher education finance.

During the late 1960s, as the nation's economic growth slowed, the question of who should pay for higher education came under fresh political scrutiny. Decades-old no-tuition policies at some campuses fell by the wayside as politicians promoted new austerity policies. In California, Governor Ronald Reagan promoted cuts to higher education as a way to win favor with business interests and conservative voters. He justified tuition as necessary given voters' aversion to any increase in taxes. In New York, federal and state politicians forced austerity on New York city to satisfy bond holders. New York reformers claimed that The City University of New York's longstanding no-tuition policy was no longer financially feasible. In the context of a stagnant economy and a growing conservative movement embracing austerity, no-tuition policies fell out of favor in many areas of the country during this period.

== Overview of tuition rates in the U.S. ==
The United States has one of the most expensive higher education systems in the world, Public colleges have no control over one major revenue source: the state budget. In 2023–24, the weighted average list price for annual tuition in the United States ranged from an average of $11,260 for in-state students at public four-year institutions to $41,540 for private four-year institutions. Due to the high price of college tuition, about 43 percent of students reject their first choice of schools.

Tuition and fees do not include the cost of housing and food. For most students in the US, the cost of living away from home, whether in a dorm room or by renting an apartment, would exceed the cost of tuition and fees. In the 2024–2025 school year, estimated cost of undergraduate room and board ranges from $13,000 to $15,000 for both public and private four year institutions.

== Causes of tuition increases ==
=== Cost shifting and privatization ===
The inflation-adjusted cost of U.S. higher education has more than doubled in fifty years.

Between 2007–08 and 2017–18, published in-state tuition and fees at public four-year institutions increased at an average rate of 3.2% per year beyond inflation, compared with 4.0% between 1987–88 and 1997–98 and 4.4% between 1997–98 and 2007-08. One cause of increased tuition is the reduction of state and federal appropriations to state colleges, causing the institutions to shift the cost over to students in the form of higher tuition. State support for public colleges and universities has fallen by about 26 percent per full-time student since the early 1990s. In 2011, for the first time, American public universities took in more revenue from tuition than state funding. Critics say the shift from state support to tuition represents an effective privatization of public higher education. About 80 percent of American college students attend public institutions.

Critics also note that investments in higher education are severely tax disadvantaged compared to other investments. Heavy taxes and inadequate subsidies to higher education contribute to underinvestment in education and a shortage of educated labor, as demonstrated by the very high pre-tax returns to investments in higher education.

=== Bubble theory ===
The view that higher education is a bubble is controversial. Most economists do not think the returns to college education are falling. On the contrary, they appear to be both increasing and much higher than the returns on other investments such as the stock market, bonds, real estate, or private equity.

One rebuttal to the claims that a bubble analogy is misleading is the observation that the 'bursting' of the bubble are the negative effects on students who incur student debt. For example, the American Association of State Colleges and Universities reports that "Students are deeper in debt today than ever before...The trend of heavy debt burdens threatens to limit access to higher education, particularly for low-income and first-generation students, who tend to carry the heaviest debt burden. Federal student aid policy has steadily put resources into student loan programs rather than need-based grants, a trend that straps future generations with high debt burdens. Even students who receive federal grant aid are finding it more difficult to pay for college."

=== Student loans ===
Another proposed cause of increased tuition is U.S. Congress' occasional raising of the 'loan limits' of student loans, in which the increased availability of students to take out deeper loans sends a message to colleges and universities that students can 'afford more,' and then, in response, institutions of higher education raise tuition to match, leaving the student back where they began, but deeper in debt. College fees begin to accumulate when people start college, such as orientation and freshman fees, and additional charges upon your departure, such as senior and commencement fees. In 1987, then-Secretary of Education William Bennett argued that "... increases in financial aid in recent years have enabled colleges and universities blithely to raise their tuitions, confident that Federal loan subsidies would help cushion the increase." This statement came to be known as the "Bennett Hypothesis."

The nonpartisan New York Fed studied the effect of increased loan supply on tuition following large policy changes in federal aid program maximums available to undergraduate students that occurred between 2008 and 2010 found "that institutions that were most exposed to these [loan limit] maximums ahead of the policy changes experienced disproportionate tuition increases around these changes, with effects of changes in institution-specific program maximums of Pell Grant, subsidized."

However, many empirical studies that have tested the effects of student loans on college tuition find no evidence of an increase in tuition, especially net of scholarships and after taking into account increases in the quality of education funded by increases in tuition. Moreover, the widespread availability of private student loans makes it unlikely that public student loan availability limits demand for education.

An additional rebuttal to the student loan theory is the fact that even in years when loan limits have not risen, tuition has still continued to climb, and tuition has increased more at public institutions than at private institutions. Public college tuition has jumped 33 percent nationwide since 2000.

One recent working paper posted online by the Federal Reserve Bank of New York in 2015 (revised in 2016) concluded that undergraduate institutions more exposed to increases in student loan program maximums tend to respond with modest raises in tuition prices. The working paper has not yet been subject to peer review.

=== Lack of bankruptcy protection ===
A third, novel theory claims that the recent change in federal law removing all standard consumer protections (truth in lending, bankruptcy proceedings, statutes of limits, the right to refinance, adherence to usury laws, and Fair Debt & Collection practices, etc.) strips students of the ability to declare bankruptcy, and, in response, the lenders and colleges know that students, defenseless to declare bankruptcy, are on the hook for any amount that they borrow, including late fees and interest, which can be capitalized and increase the principal loan amount, thus removing the incentive to provide students with a reasonable loan. However, changes in the availability of bankruptcy discharge for private student loans caused no changes in the pricing or availability of private student loans, suggesting that this theory is implausible.

=== Additional factors ===
Other factors that have been implicated in increased tuition include the following:

- The practice of 'tuition discounting,' in which a college awards financial aid from its own funds. This assistance to low-income students means that 'paying' students have to 'make up' for the difference: increased tuition. According to Inside Higher Ed, a 2011 report from the National Association of College and University Business Officers explains more about the practice of tuition discounting. The article notes that "while the total amount spent on institutional aid for freshmen rose, the average amount that institutions spent per student actually dropped slightly" and gives, as one possible reason for the drop, that between 2008 and 2011 "colleges and universities had to lower the amount they gave to each student to help cover a larger number of students."
- According to Mark Kantrowitz, a recognised expert in the area, "The most significant contributor to tuition increases at public and private colleges is the cost of instruction. It accounts for a quarter of the tuition increase at public colleges and a third of the increase at private colleges."
- Kantrowitz' study also found, "Complying with the increasing number of regulations — in particular, with the reporting requirements — adds to college costs," thus contributing to a rise in tuition to pay for these additional costs. Since deregulation, the average cost of tuition and fees at the state's public universities has increased by 90 percent, according to the Texas Higher Education Coordinating Board. Of the 181 members of the state's 83rd Legislature, more than 50 have voted at least once to advance efforts to end tuition deregulation, and fewer than 20 have consistently voted to uphold it. Many have never voted on the issue, and more than 40 members are freshmen. The rise, however, is not entirely negative. Tuition increases help universities make up for that in their budgets.
- A lawsuit against the Consortium on Financing Higher Education alleged that early admission was used to increase costs.
- Universities agreed to settle a lawsuit accusing them of price fixing.
- Use of surveillance pricing may also increase costs.

=== Recommendations ===
Commentators have recommended certain policies to varying degrees of controversy:

- State and federal governments should increase appropriations, grants, and contracts to colleges and universities.
- Federal, state, and local governments should reduce the regulatory burden on colleges and universities.
- Minimize the risk of investment in higher education through loan forgiveness or insurance programs. The federal government should enact partial or total loan forgiveness for student loans.
- Colleges and universities should look for ways to reduce costs without reducing quality.
- Federal lawmakers should return standard consumer protections (truth in lending, bankruptcy proceedings, statutes of limitations, etc.) to student loans which were removed by the passage of the Bankruptcy Reform Act of 1994, which amended the FFELP (Federal Family Education Loan Program).

== Growth of college tuition ==
"Disproportional inflation" refers to inflation in a particular economic sector that is substantially greater than inflation in general costs of living.

The following graph shows the inflation rates of general costs of living (for urban consumers; the CPI-U), medical costs (medical costs component of the consumer price index (CPI)), and college and tuition and fees for private four-year colleges (from College Board data) from 1978 to 2008. All rates are computed relative to 1978.

Cost of living increased roughly 3.25-fold during this time; medical costs inflated roughly 6-fold; but college tuition and fees inflation approached 10-fold. Another way to say this is that whereas medical costs inflated at twice the rate of cost-of-living, college tuition and fees inflated at four times the rate of cost-of-living inflation. Thus, even after controlling for the effects of general inflation, 2008 college tuition and fees posed three times the burden as in 1978.

== Economic and social concerns ==
=== Economic factors ===
Most economists believe that the benefits of higher education exceed the costs by a wide margin and that higher education more than pays for itself.

=== Social factors ===
Besides economic effects of rapidly-increasing debt burdens placed on students, there are social ramifications to higher student debt. Several studies demonstrate that students from lower income families are more likely to drop out of college to avoid debt. Middle class families are at risk because the increasing cost of college tuition may limit their acquisition of the education that allows them to succeed in their communities.

Recent reports also indicate an increase in suicides directly attributable to the stress related to distressed and defaulted student loans. The adverse mental health impacts on the student population because of economic-induced stress are becoming a social concern.

Though some universities use a cohort tuition model, many universities raise tuition on current students without proportional increases in financial aid to make up the difference. This forces students to decide between taking out more loans or dropping out.

== Student loan debt ==
A closely related issue is the increase in students borrowing to finance college education and the resulting in student loan debt. In the 1980s, federal student loans became the centerpiece of student aid received. From 2006–2012, federal student loans more than doubled and outstanding student loan debt grew to $807 billion. One of the consequences of increased student borrowing is an increase in the number of defaults. Meanwhile, two-year default rates increased from 5.2 percent in 2006 to 9.1 percent in 2012 and more than doubled the historic low of 4.5 percent set in 2003.

Since data collection began in 1987, the highest two-year default rate recorded was 22.4 percent in 1990. In 2012, the U.S. Department of Education released detailed federal student loan default rates including, for the first time, three-year default rates. For-profit institutions had the highest average three-year default rates at 22.7 percent, and public institutions rates were 11 percent and private non-profit institutions at 7.5 percent. More than 3.6 million borrowers from over 5,900 schools entered repayment during 2008–2009, and approximately 489,000 of them defaulted. For-profit colleges account for 10 percent of enrolled students but 44 percent of student loan defaults.

In 2011, the Project on Student Debt reported that approximately two thirds of students who graduated with bachelor's degrees from four-year nonprofit universities had taken out student loans, with an average debt of $25,250, an overall rise of five percent from 2009. In 2010, student loan debt surpassed credit card debt.

In his 2012 State of the Union Address, U.S. President Barack Obama addressed the rising cost of higher education in the United States. Through an executive order in 2011, Obama laid out a student loan plan, "Pay As You Earn", which allows former students to pay education debts as a percentage of their incomes. Furthermore, the Obama administration has developed an optional standardized letter to be sent to admitted students indicating the cost of attendance at an institution, including all net costs as well as financial aid received. Since 2012, the total amount of student debt has increased. Due to the coronavirus, the Relief and Economic Security Act was passed in March 2020, which ensured that the interest rate for federal student loans was set to 0% and most of the student loan payments were on hold until September 30, 2021.

== See also ==
- College admissions in the United States
- Credentialism and educational inflation
- EdFund
- Free education
- Higher education bubble in the United States
- Higher Education Price Index
- Post-secondary education
- Private university
- Student debt
- Student loans in the United States
- Cohort Tuition
- Tuition payments
- Tuition freeze
