= Commonfund =

U.S. based investment management firm

Commonfund for Non-Profit Organizations
- Company type: Nonprofit corporation
- Industry: Asset management
- Founded: 1971; 55 years ago
- Headquarters: Wilton, Connecticut, U.S.
- Number of locations: 5 offices
- Area served: Worldwide
- Key people: Mark Anson (CEO) Robert Litterman (Chairman)
- AUM: US$28 billion (2021)
- Number of employees: 240
- Website: www.commonfund.org

Based in Connecticut, Commonfund is an American asset management firm founded in 1971 with a seed grant from the Ford Foundation. As a private nonprofit organization, the firm manages customized investment programs for endowments, foundations, public pension funds, and other mission-driven institutions. The organization has additional offices in New York City, San Francisco, London, and Beijing.

Along with Yale University CIO David F. Swensen, Commonfund helped pioneer applying the "endowment model" of investing to institutional investor portfolios. As of 2021, Commonfund had approximately US$28 billion in assets under management. Commonfund is currently the second-largest manager of outsourced endowment assets in the U.S. (surpassed only by the Vanguard Group).

Commonfund also operates CF Private Equity, which builds and manages private markets portfolios, and the Commonfund Institute, which provides the investment management field with investment research and professional development programs such as the Commonfund Benchmark Studies, the Commonfund Higher Education Price Index (HEPI), the Commonfund Forum, and the Investment Stewardship Academy. The company is active in the fields of responsible and impact investing as well.
