= Student financial aid =

Economic support for students

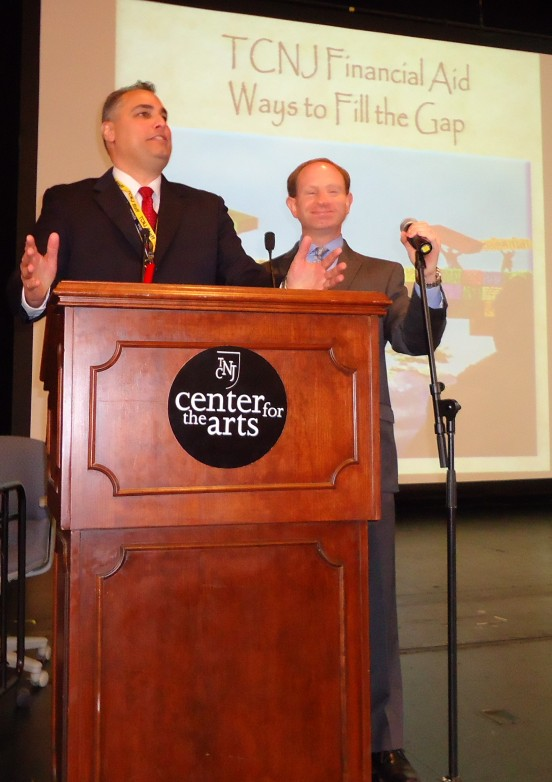
Officials from The College of New Jersey give a presentation on financial aid to admitted students in April 2013

Student financial aid (or student financial support, or student aid) is financial support given to individuals who are furthering their education. Student financial aid can come in a number of forms, including scholarships, grants, student loans, and work study programs. Each of these methods of providing financial support to students has its advantages and drawbacks.

Many countries have some kind of financial aid program for their students. In countries that provide education to all at nominal cost, financial aid may have only a tertiary link to educational status, instead tied to the economic conditions of the family, and financial support for students is primarily indirect. In Belgium, for example, "[t]here is no system of student loans and direct support is only given in the form of means-tested grants to students from low-income families", which constitutes a very limited proportion of students.

== Specific examples ==
- Student financial aid in Canada
- Student financial aid in Finland
- Student financial aid in Germany
- Student financial aid in Sweden
- Student loans and grants in the United Kingdom
- Student financial aid in the United States
