= Confidence in higher education in the United States =

Estimations of public trust in American colleges and universities

Multiple surveys conducted over a period of many years have revealed a sustained decline in public confidence in higher education in the United States, measurable across demographic and partisan groups.

== Background and methodology ==
The systematic measurement of public confidence in American institutions was pioneered by Gallup in the 1970s. Gallup asks how much confidence respondents have in various institutions, with responses grouped into "a great deal," "quite a lot," "some," or "very little." Confidence in higher education was added to this series in 2015 and has been administered periodically since. The Pew Research Center has polled on the question of whether colleges and universities are having a positive or negative effect on "the way things are going in the country."

== Survey findings by year ==
=== 2015 ===
Gallup's 2015 polling found that 57% of Americans said they had "a great deal" or "quite a lot" of confidence in higher education, while 10% expressed "very little" confidence. Majorities in key demographic and partisan subgroups expressed high confidence, with the exception of political independents, at 48%.

=== 2017 ===
A Pew Research Center survey conducted in June 2017 revealed that a majority of Republicans and Republican-leaning independents (58%) said that colleges and universities had a negative effect on the country, up from 45% in 2016 and 37% in 2015. Among Democrats, 72% continued to view colleges positively, similar to prior years. 65% of conservative Republicans said colleges have a negative impact, compared to 43% of moderate and liberal Republicans.

A 2017 Gallup follow-up survey probing the reasons for declining confidence found differing complaints by party affiliation. Democrats who lacked confidence in higher education tended to cite cost and quality, with 36% stating that college is too expensive. Republicans focused on political and ideological concerns, with 32% describing colleges as too political or too liberal and 21% citing campuses not allowing students to think for themselves.

=== 2018 ===
Gallup's polling on higher education confidence in October 2018 found that the share of Americans expressing high confidence had fallen from 57% to 48%, a 9-point drop in three years. Gallup noted that no other institution it tracked had seen as large a decline over the same period. By comparison, the next largest drop was four points for organized religion. The largest partisan drop came from Republicans, whose confidence fell 17%. Confidence had declined to some degree across all subgroups measured.

A 2018 Pew survey on public confidence in college and university professors found that 84% of Democrats and Democratic-leaning independents said they had a great deal or fair amount of confidence in professors to act in the best interests of the public, compared to 48% of Republicans and Republican leaners. 19% of Republicans expressed no confidence at all in professors.

=== 2019 ===
Pew's 2019 report on views of higher education found that 59% of Republicans and Republican-leaning independents said colleges and universities were having a negative effect on the country, the highest figures to date for that group. The share saying that colleges had a negative effect had risen from 26% to 38% among all Americans since 2012. A majority of all Americans (61%) said higher education was headed in the wrong direction. On the question of whether colleges are open to a wide range of opinions and viewpoints, 60% of Democrats said yes, while 26% of Republicans said no.

=== 2023 ===
Gallup returned to its higher education confidence measure in June 2023, in partnership with the Lumina Foundation. The results showed that only 36% of Americans expressed high confidence, down from 48% in 2018, a 12-point drop in five years and a 21-point drop from the 2015 baseline. The share expressing very little confidence had risen from 10% in 2015 to 22%. Americans were nearly equally divided among those with high confidence (36%), some confidence (32%), and little or no confidence (32%).

Republicans showed the sharpest decline. Their confidence had fallen nearly 40 percentage points since 2015, to 19%. The only subgroup with majority-level confidence was Democrats, at 59%, though that figure was down nearly 10 points compared to eight years earlier.

=== 2024 ===
Gallup's June 2024 survey, again conducted in partnership with Lumina, found the overall high-confidence figure unchanged at 36%, with little or no confidence also holding at 32%. A companion web survey of more than 2,000 Gallup Panel members allowed researchers to explore the reasons behind these attitudes. Among those expressing low confidence, 41% cited campuses being "too liberal," attempting to indoctrinate students, or not allowing students to think for themselves. Nearly the same proportion, 37%, were critical of higher education for not teaching relevant skills or for degrees that do not help graduates find employment.

=== 2025 ===
A June 2025 Gallup telephone survey of 1,402 adults, conducted again with Lumina, measured the first increase in confidence in US higher education since they began polling on the question. The share of Americans expressing high confidence rose to 42%, up from 36% in each of the previous two years. The share expressing little or no confidence fell from 32% to 23%. Increases were seen across most subgroups. College graduates rose six points to 48%. Those without a four-year degree rose seven points to 40%, Democrats rose five points to 61%, and Republicans and independents each rose six points, to 26% and 41%.

A separate Gallup/Lumina study, published in September 2025, reported that the share of Americans describing a college education as "very important" had fallen to a new low, with the decline occurring comparably across partisan lines.

Pew found in 2025 that around 70% of Americans believed that American higher education was heading in the wrong direction.

=== 2026 ===
The Foundation for Individual Rights and Expression, in partnership with NORC at the University of Chicago, published a survey by social psychologist Nate Honeycutt in February 2026. The survey found that less than a third of Americans have "a great deal" or "quite a lot" of confidence in U.S. colleges and universities, similar to 2024 and 2025 levels. Almost the same proportion report "very little" or no confidence. The FIRE/NORC poll found only 15% of Republicans expressing high confidence, a decline of 41 percentage points since 2015. Among independents, 16% expressed high confidence in 2025. Among Democrats, 45% expressed high confidence in 2026, which Honeycutt described as the lowest level recorded for Democrats for the available data. Honeycutt characterized the drop as a collapse across all partisan groups. The 26-point drop in high confidence since 2015, he noted, was accompanied by a near-tripling in the share expressing very little confidence.

== Contributing factors ==
=== Perceived political bias ===
Across multiple surveys, the most frequently volunteered reason for low confidence among Republicans and independents is the perception that universities are ideologically one-sided. FIRE noted in 2026 that "students [were] largely opposed allowing any controversial campus speaker, no matter that speaker's politics."

=== Relevance and cost ===
Roughly 37% of low-confidence respondents in the 2024 Gallup/Lumina survey cited a perceived failure to teach relevant skills or produce employable graduates. Pew's 2019 research found that majorities of both Republicans (77%) and Democrats (92%) cited high tuition as a major reason they believe higher education is headed in the wrong direction.

=== Decline of institutional trust ===
Lanae Erickson observed that higher education's decline "has aligned with confidence across a whole number of institutions in American society," and that younger adults in survey samples harbor generally lower institutional trust.

== Effects ==
Analysts have identified declining confidence in higher education in the United States as a factor in decreases in university enrollments observed during the 2020s.

== See also ==
- Foundation for Individual Rights and Expression
- Academic freedom in the United States
- Higher education in the United States
- Gallup
- NORC at the University of Chicago
- Pew Research Center
- Lumina Foundation
- Student debt in the United States
