= Student financial aid in Germany =

Assistance for paying for education in Germany

The Government of Germany provides financial aid to students in the form of loans and grants regardless of their social and economic situation. This aid is provided under the Bundesausbildungsförderungsgesetz (Federal Training Assistance Act) or "BAföG" (German pronunciation: [ˈbaːfœk]).

Groups eligible for BAföG assistance include high school students, full-time university students, second path education students (i.e., those starting to study after having been in the workforce), and students of schools for professional training. In recent years, BAföG has ensured that students especially from low-income families enrolled themselves for higher education.

== Eligibility dependent on parent income ==
Eligibility for student loans is normally dependent upon parent income, as parents are required by law to fund their children's education, including higher education. For low-income families, BAföG loans take over when these obligations cannot reasonably be met by parents. For every own child below the age of 10, living in the student's household, an additional 130.00 € can be requested. This can be reduced gradually if student or parent income or student assets exceed certain amounts. Thus, the amount paid out can be lower than the maximum amount, down to 10 € per month, should the calculations return that amount. Eligibility for a BAföG loan (even at the minimum rate) makes the student eligible for other benefits such as low cost telephone service or waiving of public television licence fees.

- To university students, BAföG loans are usually given out half as a zero-interest loan (to be repaid only after the receiver exceeds a certain income level after graduation) and half as grant money.
- High school students get the full amount as grant money if they are eligible.

To qualify for BAföG, one must generally be a citizen or permanent resident of Germany and/or have lived in Germany for five consecutive years. There are some exceptions.

Generally, BAföG repayments are capped to a maximum of 10,000 € regardless of the total loan sum that was granted. An immediate repayment, fast graduation and very good grades can result in a reduced total amount.

== Benefits ==
The current maximum amount per month (for a university student) is 992.00 € (2026). Additionally, students may receive a "starting bonus" of 1000€ at the begin of their studies.

BAföG loans are generally independent of student achievement or grades for two years. After that, a certain minimum grade level has to be met and proof of participation is required to remain eligible. Change of field of study is allowed once during the first year without becoming ineligible. For university studies, every field of study has a predefined maximum study duration (usually 3 years for undergraduate and 2 years for graduate degrees), after which the student becomes ineligible for BAföG. Further, funds can be granted as a low-interest loan for another two years if certain criteria (like reasonable likelihood that the student will graduate during that time) are met.

== Alternatives to BAföG ==
Alternatives to BAföG include the Bildungskredit ("study loan") from KfW, Bildungsfonds, in certain cases Housing Benefits and scholarships. However, in most cases to qualify for a private loan, one must have German citizenship, have EU citizenship and have resided in Germany for three consecutive years, or have graduated from a German secondary school.

== Eligibility independent of parent income ==
In some cases, most notably if the student has worked full-time for a number of years before returning to student status, BAföG eligibility is calculated independent of parent income, because parents' obligation to fund their children's education ends once the children enter the workforce full-time. In those cases, only student income and assets are consulted for BAföG eligibility and amount calculation.
