= Kela (institution) =

Institution responsible for social security in Finland

Kansaneläkelaitos
- Kela logo

Agency overview
- Formed: 16 December 1937
- Jurisdiction: Finland
- Headquarters: Helsinki
- Employees: 6,092 (31 December 2010)
- Annual budget: €12.6 billion (2010)
- Agency executive: Outi Antila, Director General
- Parent agency: Parliament of Finland
- Website: www.kela.fi/main-page

Kela (abbr. of Finnish: Kansaneläkelaitos, Swedish: Folkpensionsanstalten (Fpa), English: Social Insurance Institution of Finland) is a Finnish government agency in charge of settling benefits under national social security programs. Kela was founded in 1937 to handle retirement pay. In the 1980s and 1990s, its role was expanded to handle other fields like unemployment benefits, sickness benefits, health insurance, student financial aid, and child benefits, including a maternity package for all permanent residents.

Kela benefits are funded from three national insurance funds administered by the national government: the national pension fund, the national health insurance fund, and the general social security fund. The tax authority (Vero) collects contributions to these funds from general taxation on income, charged to both employers and employees. Rates for 2021 are available on the Vero website. Coverage under the schemes is given to all permanent residents of Finland. Kansaneläkelaitos/Folkpensionsanstalten literally means "People's Pension Institute," reflecting its original function as the national provider of retirement benefits.

== History ==
Kela was founded in 1937 during the first coalition between the Social Democratic Party and the Agrarian League (now the Centre Party) under Aimo Kaarlo Cajander as a means to relieve societal inequality and instability by providing a social safety net organization.

== Directors general ==
In оffice	Director General
2025-present	Lasse Lehtonen
2020–2025	Outi Antila
2017–2019	Elli Aaltonen
2010–2016	Liisa Hyssälä
2000–2010	Jorma Huuhtanen
1993–2000	Pekka Tuomisto
1971–1993	Jaakko Pajula
1954–1971	V. J. Sukselainen
1946–1954	Eino E. Louhio
1944–1945	Väinö Arola
1937–1944	Eero Rydman

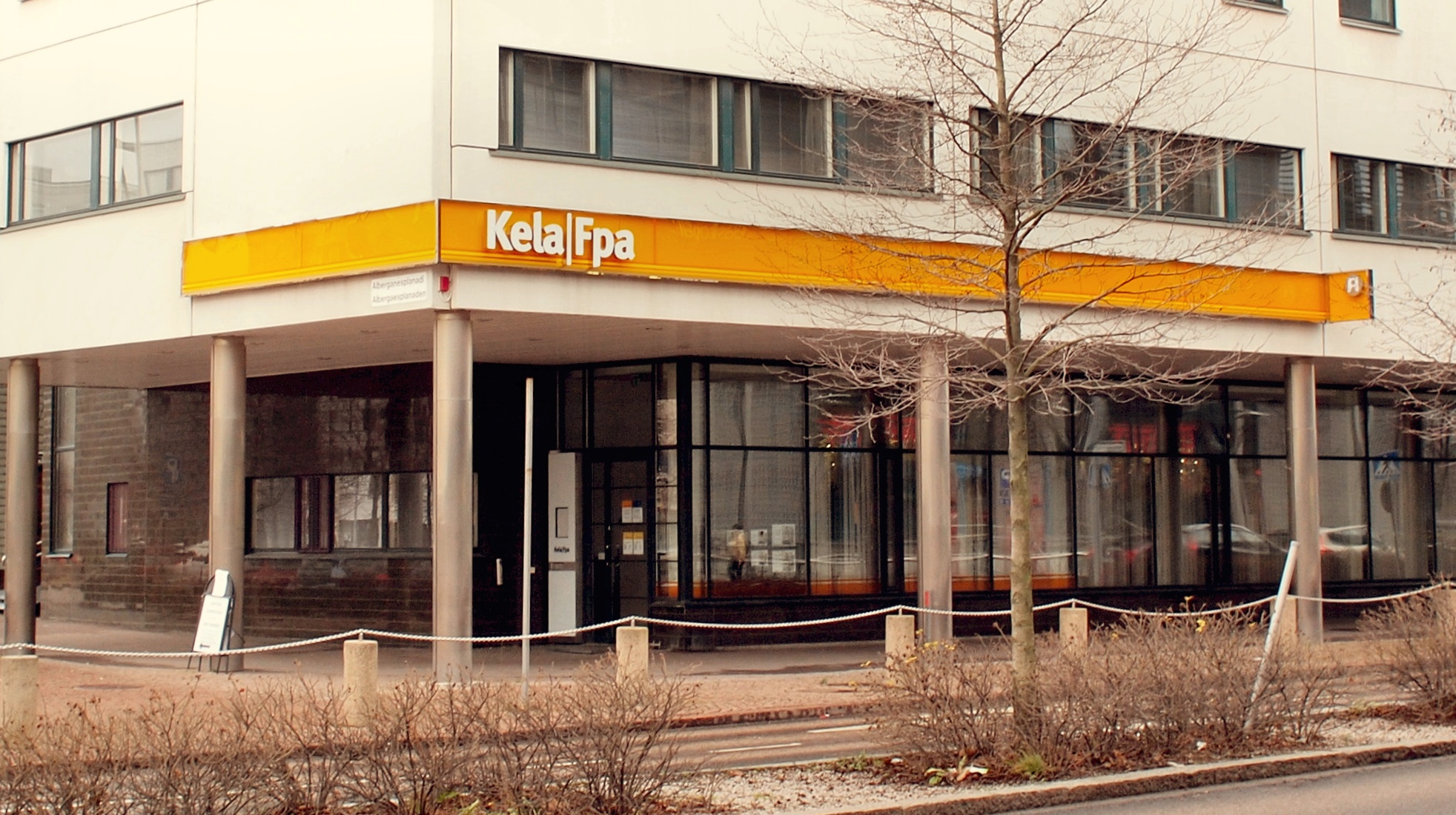
A Kela office in Espoo

== Incidents ==
In May 2008, a Kela e-service apparently disclosed confidential medical insurance information to the wrong client. Subsequently, Kela took that service offline.
