= Tuition payments =

Money charged for instruction by an educational institution

Tuition payments, usually known as tuition in American English and as tuition fees in Commonwealth English, are fees charged by education institutions for instruction or other services. Besides public spending (by governments and other public bodies), private spending via tuition payments are the largest revenue sources for education institutions in some countries. In most developed countries, especially countries in Scandinavia and Continental Europe, there are no or only nominal tuition fees for all forms of education, including university and other higher education.

== Payment methods ==
Some of the methods used to pay for tuition include:

- Scholarship
- Bursary
- Company sponsorship or funding
- Grant
- Government student loan
- Educational 7 (private)
- Family (parental) money
- Savings

== By location ==
A number of countries, such as South Africa, the United States and the United Kingdom, have "up-front tuition policies". These policies generally include a tuition fee that is large enough to give parents or guardians "a responsibility to cover some portion of their children’s higher education costs." This responsibility can make it difficult for a low-income student to attend college without requiring a grant or one or more loans.

College tuition in the United States is one of the costs of a post-secondary education. The total cost of college is called the cost of attendance (or, informally, the "sticker price") and, in addition to tuition, can include room and board and fees for facilities such as books, transportation, or commuting provided by the college.

Countries	Average university tuition fee per country in euro (data for 2019).
Croatia	68
France	260
Albania	318
Macedonia	424
Iceland	611
Luxembourg	800
Bulgaria	818
Belgium	922
B&H	1,023
Portugal	1,063
Spain	1,479
Liechtenstein	1,638
Netherlands	2,060
Serbia	2,186
Italy	2,428
Ireland	3,000
Switzerland	3,499
Northern Ireland (Note: As tuition fees varies widely in the different countries of the United Kingdom they are presented both separately and together.)	4,670
Latvia	5,500
Romania	5,917
Wales	10,104
England	10,385
UK	10,385
Lithuania	11,750
Hungary	14,906

In Europe the first cycle is free in several countries: Austria, Cyprus, Czech Republic, Denmark, Estonia, Finland, Germany, Greece, Malta, Montenegro, Norway, Poland, Scotland, Slovakia, Slovenia, Sweden, Turkey.

In Hungary the annual tuition at a public university may exceed 15,000 euros. Only 32 percent of the students pay tuition that averages 1,428 euros for a year at a 1st-degree level and 1,552 for a year at the 2nd-degree level. A student in Hungary has an opportunity to receive a scholarship of up to 3,000 euros for living expenses and nearly 4,000 euros for good grades.

In Lithuania the highest tuition is nearly 12,000 euros and 37 percent of the students pay.

Tuition fees in the United Kingdom were introduced in 1998, with a maximum permitted fee of £1,000. Since then, this maximum has been raised to £9,000 (more than €10,000) in most of the United Kingdom, however, only those who reach a certain salary threshold pay this fee through general taxation. The UK state pays for the poorest or low income to access a university, thus university attendance remains high. There are record levels of disadvantaged people accessing a university. Scotland and Wales have abolished tuition. There are no scholarships and the only assistance is a possible loan from the government.

French tuition fees are capped based on the level of education pursued, from 183 Euros per year for undergraduate up to 388 for doctorates. Some public universities have autonomous status, meaning that they can charge much higher tuition, and all private universities charge tuition.

In the German education system almost all universities and most universities of applied sciences are funded by the state and do not charge tuition fees. In exceptional cases universities may offer courses for professionals (e.g. executive MBA programs), which may require tuition payment. Some local governments have recently decided that students from non-EU countries can be charged, although ERASMUS students, students from developing countries and other special groups are exempt. In addition, some private institutions of higher education run on a tuition-based model.

All Nordic countries provide higher education free of charge to their own citizens. The Nordic education systems are almost entirely publicly funded. In Nordic countries education is seen as a civil right and a public service rather than a commodity. The issue of education is seen in these countries as an issue of equality. This is in part because high levels of education are a benefit to the development of society, including business and industry.

In Greece there are no tuition fees as Bachelor-level higher education and some Master-level post-graduate education is provided for free to all Hellene (Greek) citizens as a benefit of citizenship paid by taxes. Universities accept students who have excelled at high school, with the selection being done through the Panhellenic Examinations, a system of state-administered examinations. Furthermore, it is difficult for mature students to be accepted at universities. Doctorate-level higher education is often also provided for free, but some universities may charge fees for PhD degrees. Students may resort to registering at private universities (called colleges, κολέγια), which charge tuition fees, or emigrate to other countries in order to get an education.

In Spain, public universities fees are established annually by laws enacted by the governments of each autonomous community, following a series of basic criteria dictated by the central government and published in the Official State Gazette.

In some parts of the developing world, school fees and the expenses of "free" schooling (food, books, school uniform, etc.) prevent some children from attending school and achieving more for themselves and their families.

== By institution ==
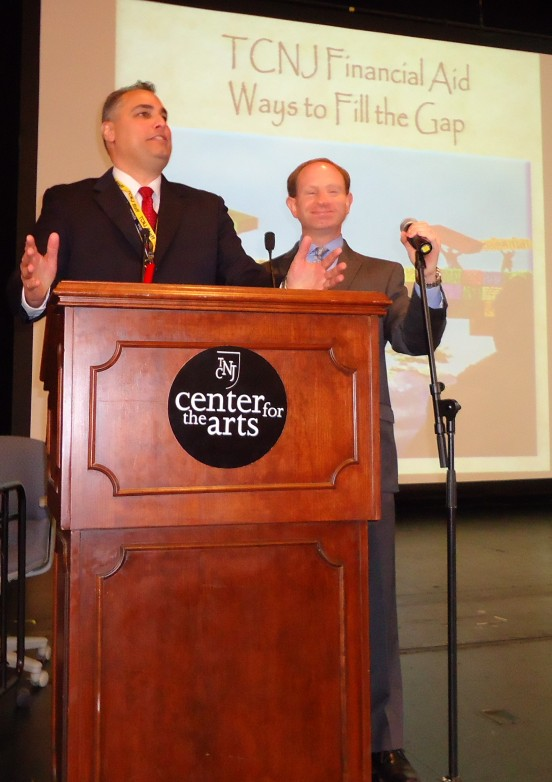
The College of New Jersey officials give a presentation on financial aid to admitted students.

Tuition is charged at different rates from one type of institution to the next. Net tuition indices mark an increase in the "relative real burden" for payments at various types of institutions for higher education; in the period between 1980 and 1995; example, this burden increased by approximately 80 percent for students at public universities and by 148 percent for students at private universities. More than half of public research universities charge students differential tuition based primarily on their major and their year in college, increasing normal tuition by up to 40 percent.

Most students or their families who pay for tuition and other education costs do not have enough savings to pay in full while they are in school. Some students must work or borrow money to afford an education. In the United States, student financial aid is available to defray the cost of a post-secondary education: "Financial aid is typically thought to exert the most influence in [attendance], when admitted students consider whether to enroll in a particular institution." It is often the case that the lower the cost of the school, the more likely a student is to attend.

Developed countries have adopted a dual scheme for education; while basic (i.e. high-school) education is supported by taxes rather than tuition, higher education usually requires tuition payments or fees.

People may purchase tuition insurance to protect themselves from fees related to involuntary withdrawal (illness, death of a parent or guardian, etc.)

== History ==
Study comparing college revenue per student by tuition and state funding in 2008 dollars

In medieval Europe, universities were mainly institutions of the Catholic Church. As they mainly trained clergy, most of these universities did not have any need to exact fees from the students with one notable exception: during the 12th century, while under the supervision of Pierre le Mangeur, the University of Paris began collecting two sous weekly in tuition.

Later, the main duty of universities in most Protestant countries was the training of future civil servants. Again, it was not in the interest of the state to charge tuition fees, as this would have decreased the quality of civil servants. On the other hand, the number of students from the lower classes was usually kept in check by the expenses of living during the years of study, although as early as the mid-19th century there were calls for limiting the university entrance by middle-class persons. A typical family, however, could not afford educating a child or young adult, even if the education itself was free.

After World War II the tuition systems of all of today's advanced democracies still were highly similar: educational institutions in all countries charged no or only very low tuition fees. It was not until the 1950s that the countries' education systems developed in different directions. Some countries, especially Anglophone countries (for example the United States) but also Asian countries such as Japan, introduced considerable tuition payments already in the early post-war period. Other countries, particularly in Scandinavia and continental Europe, in contrast remained tuition-free. These developments were unrelated to the massive educational expansion that took place at the same time.

Since the early 1970s, the average cost of tuition has steadily outpaced the growth of the average American household. This trend continued particularly under President Reagan's higher education policies in the 1980s. Likewise, there has been a steady decrease in federal funding for grants and a rise in the interest rates of most major student loans, leaving many students struggling to pay debt for years after graduation.

=== College tuition for undocumented students ===
The Development, Relief, and Education for Alien Minors (DREAM) Act was introduced in the U.S. Senate. It would allow the estimated 50,000 to 65,000 undocumented students in the United States to gain in-state tuition as well as a path towards American citizenship. The Act would apply only to those students with tangible proof of residence in the United States before the age of 18. This Act has stirred debate in numerous groups, including institutions, families, and the Senate itself.

As of March 2013, undocumented students in most States are required to pay the higher out-of-state students' tuition charged at public universities, often between $20,000 and $35,000 at a local public university. In addition, these students were denied federal assistance as they lacked valid Social Security numbers. Because such students often come from comparatively poor families, the costs are too high to allow many undocumented students to seek university education in the United States.

== See also ==
- College tuition in the United States
- Debt relief
- EdFund
- Free education
- Higher Education Price Index
- List of countries by spending on education as percentage of GDP
- Private university
- Public university
- Right to education
- Student debt
- Student financial aid
- Student loan
- Student loans in the United States
- Tertiary education
- Tuition fees in the United Kingdom
- Tuition freeze
- Universal access to education

== Attribution ==
This article incorporates text from a free content work. Licensed under CC BY 4.0. Text taken from If not Oxford, then what? How much is studying abroad and what will happen after Brexit, BiQdata, EDJNet.
