= Student loan =

Type of loan for educational expenses

A student loan is a type of loan designed to help students pay for tertiary education and the associated fees, such as tuition, books and supplies, and living expenses. It may differ from other types of loans in the fact that the interest rate may be substantially lower and the repayment schedule may be deferred while the student is still in school. It also differs in many countries in the strict laws regulating renegotiating and bankruptcy. This article highlights the differences of the student loan system in several major countries. The financial risk of student loan defaults can be carried by the tertiary education institution.

A student loan is one of many forms of student financial aid.

== Australia ==
Tertiary student places in Australia are usually funded through the HECS-HELP scheme. This funding is in the form of loans that are not normal debts. They are repaid over time via a supplementary tax, using a sliding scale based on taxable income. As a consequence, loan repayments are only made when the former student has income to support the repayments. Discounts are available for early repayment. The scheme is available to citizens and permanent humanitarian visa holders. Means-tested scholarships for living expenses are also available. Special assistance is available to indigenous students.

There has been criticism that the HECS-HELP scheme creates an incentive for people to leave the country after graduation, because those who do not file an Australian tax return do not make any repayments.

== Canada ==
The province of British Columbia allows the Insurance Corporation of British Columbia to withhold issuance or renewal of driver's license to those with delinquent student loan repayments or child support payments or unpaid court fines. Students need to meet the qualification with an individual's direct educational costs and living expense to get the certificate to obtain a loan and this policy is directly controlled by the government.

== New Zealand ==
New Zealand provides student loans and allowances to tertiary students who satisfy the funding criteria. Full-time students can claim loans for both fees and living costs while part-time students can only claim training institution fees. While the borrower is a resident of New Zealand, no interest is charged on the loan. Loans are repaid when the borrower starts working and has income above the minimum threshold, once this occurs employers will deduct the student loan repayments from the salary at a fixed 12c in the dollar rate and these are collected by the New Zealand tax authority.

== Thailand ==
The public sector is one of the most important sections in Thailand's higher education system. In addition, many public educational organizations usually receive profits from the students' tuition fees and the governments. Specifically, There are six various sections in the public sector's organization: colleges with the limited enrollment，universities which is opening to public, universities which is national autonomous, Rajabhat colleges, Ajamangala Universities of Technology, and polytechnic colleges.

== India ==
The Indian government has launched a portal, Vidya Lakshmi, for students seeking educational loans and five banks including SBI, IDBI Bank and Bank of India have integrated their system with the portal. Vidya Lakshmi was launched on the occasion of Independence Day i.e. 15 August 2015 for the benefit of students seeking educational loans. Vidya Lakshmi was developed under three departments of India i.e. Department of Financial Services, Department of Higher Education and Indian Banks Association (IBA). Vidya Lakshmi Portal has been developed under the Pradhan Mantri Vidya Lakshmi Karyakram and announced by the finance minister Shri Arun Jaitley in the budget speech of FY 2015–16. As of August 15, 2020, 37 banks were registered on the Vidya Lakshmi Portal and offered 137 loan schemes

To bridge the constraint of increasing institutional fees, NSDL e-Governance in India launched the Vidyasaarathi portal to help students seeking scholarship for studies in India or overseas.

The education loan is expected to grow at a rate of 32.3 percent in 2009-10, 39.8 percent each in 2010-11and 2011-12, and 44.8 percent during the period 2012–13 to 2014–15.

== South Korea ==
South Korea's student loans are managed by the Korea Student Aid Foundation (KOSAF) which was established in May 2009. According to the governmental philosophy that Korea's future depends on talent development and no student should quit studying due to financial reasons, they help students grow into talents that serve the nation and society as members of Korea. Normally, in South Korea, the default rate of redemption is related to each student's academic personalities. For instance, comparing with other majors, students in fine arts and physics are supposed to possessing a higher default rate. Therefore, students in such majors would be inclined to a higher rate of unemployment and a higher risk of default in redemption. Also, people will tend to have an inferior quality of human capital if the period of unemployment is too long.

== United Kingdom ==
Student loans in the United Kingdom are primarily provided by the state-owned Student Loans Company. Interest begins to accumulate on each loan payment as soon as the student receives it, but repayment is not required until the start of the next tax year after the student completes (or abandons) their education.

Since 1998, repayments have been collected by HMRC via the tax system, and are calculated based on the borrower's current level of income. If the borrower's income is below a certain threshold (£15,000 per tax year for 2011/2012, £21,000 per tax year for 2012/2013), no repayments are required, though interest continues to accumulate.

Loans are canceled if the borrower dies or becomes permanently unable to work. Depending on when the loan was taken out and which part of the UK the borrower is from, they may also be canceled after a certain period of time usually after 30 years, or when the borrower reaches a certain age.

Student loans taken out between 1990 and 1998, in the introductory phase of the UK government's phasing in of student loans, were not subsequently collected through the tax system in the following years. The onus was (and still is) on the loan holder to prove their income falls below an annually calculated threshold set by the government if they wish to defer payment of their loan. A portfolio of early student loans from the 1990s was sold, by The Department for Business, Innovation and Skills in 2013. Erudio, a company financially backed by CarVal and Arrow Global was established to process applications for deferment and to manage accounts, following its successful purchasing bid of the loan portfolio in 2013.

There are complaints that graduates who have fully repaid their loans are still having £300 a month taken from their accounts and cannot get this stopped.

As of January 2025, student loan borrowers in the United Kingdom on repayment plan five will have their loan canceled after 40 years from when they are due to start making payments.

== United States ==
In the United States, there are two types of student loans: federal loans sponsored by the federal government and private student loans, which broadly includes state-affiliated nonprofits and institutional loans provided by schools. The overwhelming majority of student loans are federal loans. Federal loans can be "subsidized" or "unsubsidized." Interest does not accrue on subsidized loans while the students are in school. Student loans may be offered as part of a total financial aid package that may also include grants, scholarships, and/or work study opportunities. Whereas interest for most business investments is tax deductible, Student loan interest is generally not deductible. Critics contend that tax disadvantages to investments in education contribute to a shortage of educated labor, inefficiency, and slower economic growth.

Prior to 2010, federal loans were also divided into direct loans (which are originated and funded by the federal government) and guaranteed loans, originated and held by private lenders but guaranteed by the government. The guaranteed lending program was eliminated in 2010 because of a widespread perception that the government guarantees boosted student lending companies' profits but did not benefit students by reducing student loan costs.

Federal student loans are less expensive than private student loans. The federal government offers direct consolidation loans through the Federal Direct Loan Program. The new interest rate is the weighted average of the previous loans. Private loans don't qualify for this program. The interest rate of borrowers with federal student loans is nearly equal to the weighted average rate on the former loans while the new interest rate of private loans depends on the one-month London interbank offered rate. Therefore, these two student loans are different in both application and definition. Students can apply for student loans with the Department of Education which enables any school to take part in its Direct Loan project.

Some believe that the education of workers would bring societal benefits such as reducing stress on public services, reducing medical expenses, increasing incomes, and promoting employment rates. These people propose that federal student loan rates should be adjusted with specific courses, relative to the rate of risk and societal returns from various studies.

The Master Promissory Note is an agreement between the lender and the borrower that promises to repay the loan. It is a binding legal contract.

=== Qualification ===
Most college students in the United States qualify for federal student loans. Students can borrow the same amount of money, at the same price, regardless of their own income or their parents' incomes, regardless of their expected future income, and regardless of their credit history. Only students who have defaulted on federal student loans or have been convicted of drug offenses, and have not completed a rehabilitation program, are excluded. The amount students can borrow each year depends on their education level (undergraduate or graduate), and their status as dependent or independent. Undergraduates are eligible for subsidized loans, with no interest while the student is in school. Graduate students can borrow more per year.

Private lenders use different underwriting criteria, including credit rating, income level, parents' income level, and other financial considerations. Students only borrow from private lenders when they exhaust the maximum borrowing limits under federal loans. Several scholars have advocated eliminating the borrowing limit on federal loans and enabling students to borrow according to their needs (tuition plus living expenses) and thereby eliminating high-cost private loans.

=== Repayment ===
Traditionally, repayment starts six months after graduation or leaving school. Federal student loan interest rates are established by Congress and listed in § 20 U.S.C. § 1087E(b). Because the interest rates are established by Congress, interest rates are a political decision. In 2010, the federal student loan program ran a multibillion-dollar "negative subsidy", or profit, for the federal government.

Financial relief can provide a safety net for those under intense pressure to repay, leading many towards gaining income and avoiding defaulting. With federal student loans, the student may have multiple options for extending the repayment period. An extension of the loan term will reduce the monthly payment and increase the amount of total interest paid on the principal balance during the life of the loan (the unpaid interest and any penalties become capitalized, i.e. added to the loan balance). Extension options include extended payment periods offered by the original lender and federal loan consolidation. There are also other extension options including income-based repayment plans and hardship deferments.

==== Income-based repayment ====
The Income-based repayment (IBR) plan is an alternative to paying back federal student loans, which allows the borrowers to pay back loans based on how much they make, and not based how much money is actually owed. Income-based repayment is a federal program and is not available for private loans.

IBR plans generally cap loan payments at 10 percent of the student borrower's income. Deferred interest accrues, and the balance owed grows. However, after a certain number of years, the balance of the loan is forgiven. This period is 10 years if the student borrower works in the public sector (government or a nonprofit) and 25 years if the student works at a for-profit. Debt forgiveness may be treated as taxable income, but can be excluded as taxable under certain circumstances, like bankruptcy and insolvency. Loans forgiven through the Public Service Loan Forgiveness program are not considered taxable income.

=== Rising student debt ===
Federal aid policies expanded loan eligibility and shifted from grants to loans starting the rising student debt. The Federal Pell Grant, a form of federal aid for higher education students that does not need to be re-paid, only provides a maximum annual grant of $6,195 per student for the 2019-2020 award year. With the average annual tuition cost for a four year in-state public university averaging $26,590 for the 2019–2020 academic year, many students are forced to take out student loans to bridge the gap between grants and their annual tuition costs. More students over the years have been actively enrolled in universities, with enrollment in for-profit universities growing by over 5 million in the past 10 years. For-profit universities enroll only 10% of the nations active college enrollment, yet hold nearly 20% of all federal student loan. States have also deprived public support and shifted the financial burden onto students by increasing the cost of tuition. With the median family income on a steady decline each year since 2007 up until 2012, it saw increasing difficulty for students to pay back college tuition out of savings and labor income. Between 2002 and 2012, public spending on education dropped 30%, while total enrollment at public colleges and universities jumped 34%. Ninety-two percent of student debt is loaned directly by the federal government. In 2020, the amount of student loan debt had reached $1.6 trillion.

=== Default ===
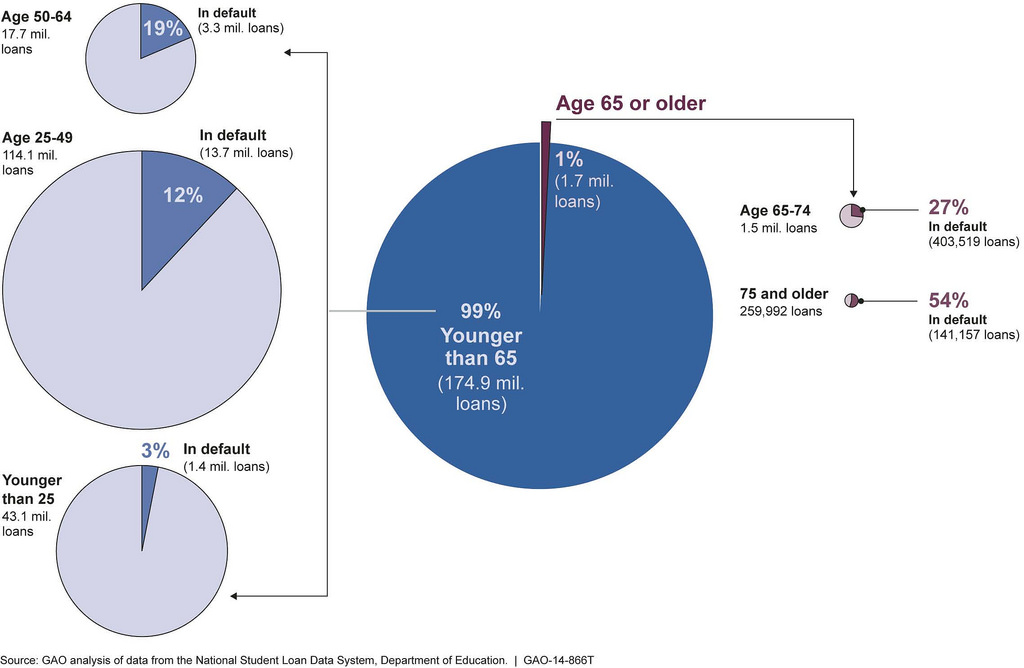
Percentage of Federal Student Loans in default within age groups, Fiscal Year 2013. In 2013, around 17 percent of parent plus loans were in default from ages 65 to 74, and 30 percent of their own education loans were in default.

Borrowers from families with low income with separation are more likely to default than those from higher-income families. Default rates on student loans were found to be higher for women than for men. Borrowers entering repayment after their sophomore year are more likely to default.

Loans to graduate and professional students are especially profitable because of high-interest rates and low default rates. Usually, the net flow of the default rate on student loans are strongly related to the nontraditional issuer and the flowing price of the tangible assets. However, in contrast to the positive correlation with the borrower, a change in the price normally leads to a negative influence on the default rate. These two aspects have been used to explain the Great Recession of student loan default, which had grown to nearly thirty percent.

Student loans cannot be discharged in bankruptcy unless repaying the loan would create an "undue hardship" for the student borrower and dependents of the borrower. In 2005, the bankruptcy laws were changed so that private educational loans also could not be readily discharged. Supporters of this change claimed that it would reduce student loan interest rates; critics said it would increase the lenders' profit.

=== Criticism ===
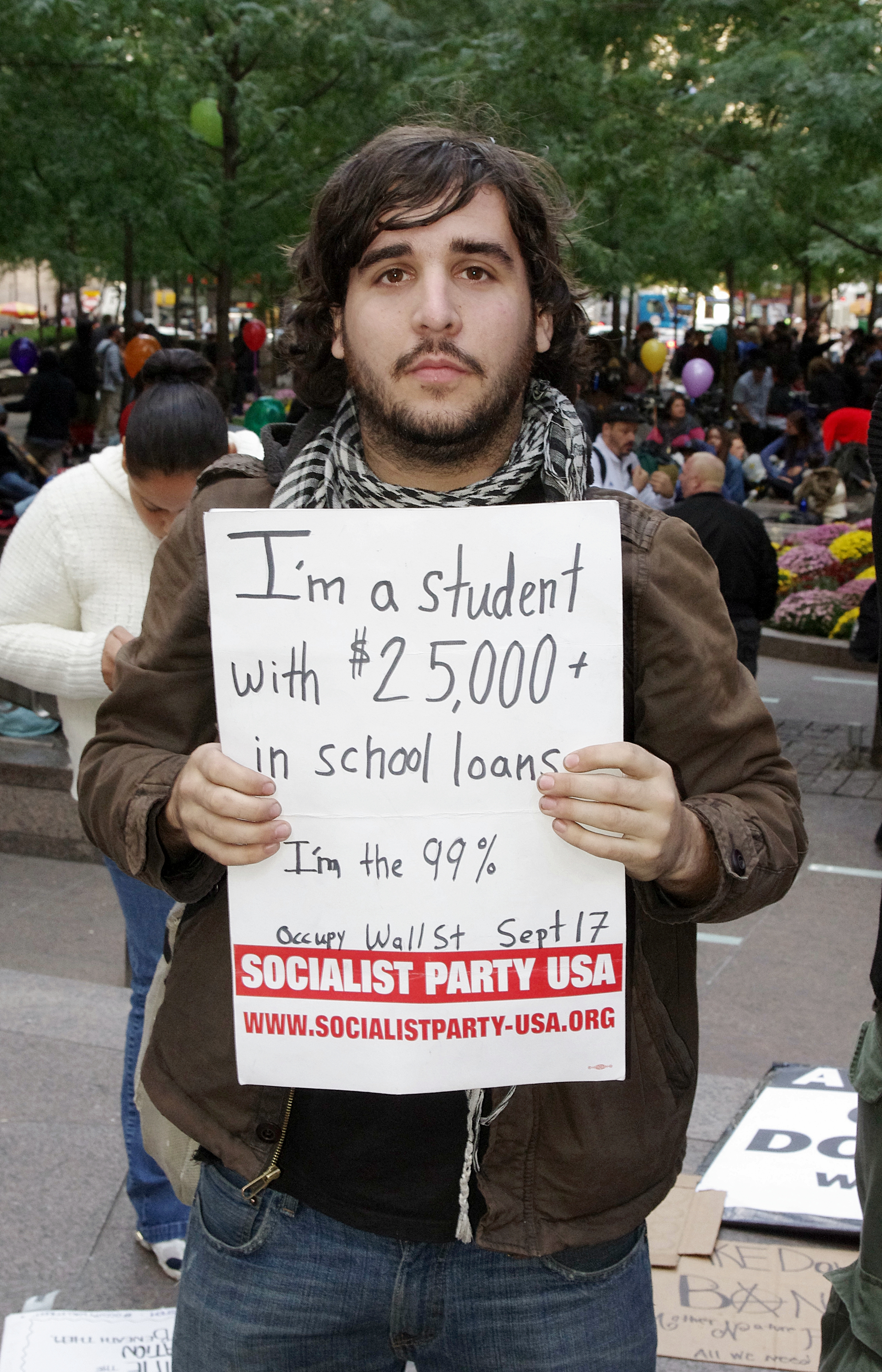
Occupy Boston activist Nelson Terry at the Occupy Wall Street event in New York City protesting student loan debt, September 19, 2011

In coverage through established media outlets, many borrowers have expressed feelings of victimization by the student loan corporations. There is a comparison between these accounts and the college credit card trend in America during the 2000s, though the amounts owed by students on their student loans are almost always higher than the amount owed on credit cards. Student loans cannot be discharged in a bankruptcy proceeding unless the debtor can demonstrate "undue hardship." After the passage of the bankruptcy reform bill of 2005, even private student loans are not discharged during bankruptcy. This provided a credit risk free loan for the lender, averaging 7 percent a year.

In 2007, Andrew Cuomo, then Attorney General of New York State, led an investigation into lending and anti-competitive practices between student lenders and universities. Specifically, many universities steered student borrowers to "preferred lenders" which resulted in those borrowers incurring higher interest rates. Some of these "preferred lenders" allegedly rewarded university financial aid staff with "kickbacks". This has led to changes in lending policy at many major American universities. Many universities have also rebated millions of dollars in fees back to affected borrowers.

In 2007, a false claims lawsuit was filed on behalf of the federal government by former Department of Education researcher Jon Oberg against Sallie Mae, Nelnet, and other lenders. Oberg argued that the lenders overcharged the U.S. government and defrauded taxpayers of millions and millions of dollars. In August 2010, Nelnet settled the lawsuit and paid $55 million.

Since 2005, Bankruptcy reform lead debtors have to take the responsibility of private student loan debt in bankruptcy which can decline debtors’ intention of reducing costly defaults to declare bankruptcy.

As of 2013, many economists are predicting a new economic crisis will emerge as a result of an estimated $1 trillion of student loan debt currently impacting two thirds of graduating college students in America. However, most economists and investors believe that there is no student loan bubble.

In his 2020 presidential campaign, Joe Biden promised student loan forgiveness. 64% of Americans back student loan forgiveness of $10,000 for individuals earning up to $150,000 annually.

== Hong Kong ==
The loan scheme for Hong Kong students was introduced in 1969. This scheme aimed to help full-time students at two universities: the Chinese University of Hong Kong and Hong Kong University. The program was extended in 1976 to cover full-time students in the Hong Kong Polytechnic, and further extended in 1982 to cover post-advanced level students in the Hong Kong Baptist College. In 1984 loans were expanded to include students in the new city Polytechnic. The scheme is controlled by the secretary of the university and Polytechnic Grants Committee, which is advised by the Joint Committee On Student Finance. The applicant of the loan scheme must have resided or been domiciled in Hong Kong for three years immediately prior to application. In 1990, a new government office, the Student Financial Assistance Agency, was also established to coordinate the administration of the student loan scheme.

== See also ==
- College tuition in the United States
- EdFund
- Free education
- Higher Education Bubble
- Higher Education Price Index
- Post-secondary education
- Private university
- Student benefit
- Student debt
- Tuition agency
- Tuition center
- Tuition fees
- Tuition freeze
