= EdFund =

Federal Family Education Loan Program

EdFund is the United States' second largest provider of student loan guarantee services under the Federal Family Education Loan Program (FFELP). It is organized as a non-profit public-benefit corporation. EdFund offers students and their families a wide range of information on the value of higher education, how to pursue it, how to pay for it, and debt management. In addition, EdFund supports schools with advanced loan processing solutions and default prevention techniques.

Operating as an auxiliary corporation of the California Student Aid Commission, EdFund processes more than $9.3 billion in student loans in the United States annually (including Consolidation loans) and manages a portfolio of outstanding loans valued at $29 billion.

EdFund is headquartered in Rancho Cordova, California with regional offices located throughout the United States.

== History ==
EdFund is a nonprofit corporation founded by the California Student Aid Commission on January 1, 1997.

EdFund was organized as a 501(c)(3) public benefit corporation pursuant to legislation authorizing the Commission to establish a nonprofit auxiliary to administer all activities associated with its participation in the federal student loan program.

Today, EdFund provides all operational and administrative services related to the Commission’s participation in the federal student loan program, and is a growing national provider of student financial aid services.

"On August 27, 2010, the U.S. Department of Education selected Educational Credit Management Corporation (ECMC) to assume the guarantor responsibilities of CSAC effective November 1, 2010; consequently, all federal student loans guaranteed by CSAC and serviced through EdFund have been transferred to ECMC for ongoing servicing.

EdFund staff will continue to service the non-defaulted segment of the former CSAC portfolio per an agreement with ECMC. Also as part of this agreement, EdFund will provide ECMC with transition services, systems and web services.

== Governance ==
EdFund is governed by a board of directors that meets quarterly. The company also has regional offices located across the nation.

== Criticism ==
EdFund has been criticized for its collection policies and punitive practices, as well as for the salaries paid to executive officers. A 2007 San Francisco Chronicle article describes how in certain circumstances, EdFund’s practices can take an original loan of $37,000 and drive the repayment cost well over $100,000. The article quotes Elena Ackel, a senior attorney at Legal Aid Foundation of Los Angeles, as describing EdFund as “an oppressive system.”

In 2006, a California state auditor strongly criticized EdFund, finding that the organization exercised lax oversight and made questionable spending decisions. The auditor found that EdFund spent thousands of dollars on entertainment, travel, and executive bonuses, at a time when the loan program faced an $8.3 million operating deficit. The California Student Aid Commission was cited for lax oversight of EdFund.

== See also ==
- College tuition in the United States
- Tertiary education
- Private university
- Student debt
- Student loan
- Student loans in the United States
- Tuition payments
- Tuition freeze
