= Cost-shifting =

Mutual financing agreement

Cost-shifting is an economic situation where one individual, group, or government underpays for a service, resulting in another individual, group, or government overpaying for a service (shifting compared to the expected burden). It can occur when one group pays a smaller share of costs than before, resulting in another group paying a larger share of costs than before (shifting compared to the previous arrangement). Some commentators on health policy in the United States believe the former currently happens in Medicare and Medicaid as they underpay for services resulting in private insurers overpaying. Although the term cost shift is used in the field of healthcare these days and there are many studies about it, other fields have more or less used it. For example, its origins go back to the environmental economy where cost-shifting referred to the practice where corporations pass the harmful consequences and negative externalities of economic production to third parties and communities whether those that are part of the production circuit or are in some way beneficiaries or those that are outside this circle, K.W. Kapp, is one who coined the concept. This concept is also used in the American legal system, especially since the cost of electronic discovery has increased dramatically due to a large amount of raw information and the urgent need to extract relevant data, its processing, and analysis. In the past, each of the plaintiffs and defendants had to bear the cost, but later many of those who prepared the summons demanded the transfer of the cost because they thought they would have to pay for something they did not do. In this regard, some courts have agreed to shift part of the costs to the complainant.

== Australia ==
In New South Wales, Australia, the term cost-shifting is usually used to refer to local councils placing an extra burden on Ratepayers to pay for services that the council is ill-equipped to provide due to a lack of state or federal government funding.

== Cost-shifting in utilities and infrastructure ==
Cost shifting occurs when the financial burden of maintaining and expanding infrastructure, such as roads and utility grids, is redistributed from one group of users to another. For example, in road infrastructure, vehicles that are more fuel-efficient or fully electric contribute less to fuel tax revenues, which traditionally fund road maintenance. As a result, the cost of maintaining roads may be shifted to other users, such as those driving less efficient vehicles, through increased taxes or tolls.

Similarly, in utility infrastructure, when customers install energy-efficient devices or generate their own electricity with solar panels, their reduced reliance on the grid means they contribute less to the fixed costs of maintaining the infrastructure. Consequently, these costs are shifted to customers who do not have the means to make such upgrades, leading to higher rates for those who continue to rely solely on the utility for their electricity needs.

== Cost-shifting in healthcare ==
Cost-shifting can mean many different things. It can mean a situation where different groups are charged different prices or it can mean a situation where a group underpays for some services. But in the end, it is a situation, where the cost does not really equal the service. But this is not third-degree price discrimination because it relies on high market power that comes from the two shaping properties of the segmented markets. During discrimination, each segment of the market is offered a price so that the amount of surplus received from each customer group is at its highest level and none of the market segments is unprofitable to a predominantly monopoly producer while cost-shifting is a solution to compensate for one group's lack of payment through another. in other words, underpayment of public programs in healthcare like Medicare and Medicaid is rectified by higher corresponding prices for private payers somehow the private payment to cost ratio is significantly and negatively correlated with that of public programs. However cost-shifting need not be dollar per dollar, as hospitals can absorb some degree of cost-shifting pressure through increased efficiency and decreases in service provision.

=== Types ===
There are two important types: static cost-shifting (price discrimination), that is the ability to charge different prices to different customers. The other one is the dynamic cost-shifting, which means charging the maximal amount of money that the customer is able to pay (not necessarily the highest possible value, but the value that people are still willing to pay for the service). Although there are some pieces of evidence that prove hospitals practice this procedure but their ability to shift costs dynamically decreases over time.

For example, the hospitals may have two groups of patients. There are those who are covered by the government. From this group the hospital get fixed costs from the government. On the other hand, the second group of patients are those, who pay for their treatments. Those patients can buy more hospital care at a lower price.

The hospital that wants to earn as much profit as it can, has to decide whether it will accept patients covered by the government (lower income for hospital), and how much it should charge to the patients that pay for their treatments. This is another case of cost-shifting. Both groups pay for the same service (hospital), but each has to pay different sum.

But in a competitive market there is rarely any price discrimination, nor cost-shifting, because as soon as the hospital would have raised a price to one of those two groups of patients, they would seek care in some other hospital, therefore the hospital would only lose money.

=== Problems of cost-shifting in healthcare ===
The problem of cost-shifting in health care is based on the fact that Medicare pays hospitals only a fraction of the patient's costs, which is often significantly lower than the replacement cost.

The US government says that this gap (the cost gap between the patient’s real cost and the compensation), is because the compensation is paying only for the costs of the treatment (meaning, it pays the doctors and hospital for the expenses).

=== Overview ===
Cost-shifting has been discussed for a long time. It is still assumed to be one of controversial topics in USA healthcare politics. There are studies, which try to clarify why and where in the system this phenomenon originates. Researchers try to provide facts and studies to explain how private payers are charged more in response to shortfalls in public payments and so partly pay for state insured payers.

Cost-shifting is a situation in which people may pay for the same goods or services at different prices. One of the biggest known examples is in the US healthcare system. Few causes could be that in the USA the health insurance is not obligatory, or there exist more systems of insurance. Workers are usually insured by their employer. However, the most people are state-insured by state insurance programs Medicare and Medicaid. Because of multiple insurance system and other factors (such as deals between insurers and hospitals and so on), a subsidy system which supports the healthcare in the USA. On one side are sited regular insurance payers who could subsidize healthcare for the other insured patience. On the other are people, who are state insured because they cannot afford any other kind of insurance. Cost-shifting is caused by some reasons mentioned in following paragraphs.

=== Cost-cutting as a cause of cost-shifting ===
Cost-shifting is a situation where one group of payers overpays costs for a good or a service for another group, which in total pays less than the first one.

This problem originates in hospitals. They need to pay for treatment and staff performing it. Hospitals need to balance their costs and incomes. Problem begins in communication between hospitals and insurers, who want to save as much money as possible. Therefore, hospitals cannot charge their patients higher prices. If they did, it could lead to terminating a contract between hospital and insurer and moving a patient into a different hospital.

Further there are public programs such as Medicare and Medicate, which are limited by law.

Main reason is that revenue from state insured patients is lower than from private insured patients.

From that reason hospitals and healthcare facilities could be forced to come to cost-cutting or cross-subsidization, in order to balance their incomes and expenditures. That means that they for example charge private insurance for additional treatment, which was never did, because they need to obtain more money from private insurer. On of possible solutions could be deficit, which is not in long terms sustainable. Mendoza states that small deficit could be caused by revenue deficit, caused by change of insurer by payers, or by third-party payer, who refuses to pay the whole amount of money for his insured member. This situation could happen mainly with costs unrelated to a treatment.

Cost shifting is assumed to be present in medical facilities with a higher rate of state insured patients. According to the source there are studies which presents a development of differences in payments between private and public insurers. It suggests that Medicare and Medicaid payment reductions could cause significantly lower profits and so started cost-cutting in hospitals necessary to avoid closing hospitals.

According to the study written by Roger Lee Mendoza there could be assumed some discrimination premises which may lead to cost-shifting:

1. Hospitals may charge different payers different prices (including charges after a negotiated discount) for the same treatments and services, as some payers are more price-sensitive.
2. The higher price charged to some payers (including self-payers) should average the relationship of cost to treatment or service for each patient served.
3. The higher amount paid by certain payers might be intended not only to address below-cost reimbursements, but also the volume of payers and the desired total margin, especially of a for-profit hospital or healthcare organization.

When fixed costs rise (i.e. administrative expenses) the willingness of medical facilities to cost cut of possible price shifting may increase. When a group of payers become less price-sensitive, hospitals may charge payers a higher price, and so compensate for their losses. But that commonly does not happen by state insured patients. Their charges paid by a public insurer remain the same, because they are formed by law and bargained when a contract between facility and insurer is made. That further leads to weakening of market power of hospitals and healthcare organisations.

=== Cost-cutting ===
Mendoza in his study highlights that some studies suggest that hospital cost-cutting, if done efficiently, could absorb reimbursement shortfalls from either public or private payers. That means, if hospital management decides to cut costs, they can set an equilibrium. But they also have to exclude some services they have provided. However, there is no guarantee that it will be sustainable. Possible negative effect If policy makers fail to create proper borders could be a situation, which leads to unfair cost-shifting.

The Problem comes from the US government programs such as Medicare and Medicaid, where prices are set low by law and so are not always able to cover all expenses. Another fact influencing a level of reimbursements are negotiations between healthcare providers and insurers. Insurance providers negotiate favourable prices which also have an influence on their own profit. Therefore, they prefer to set as low charges as possible.

=== Effect of Medicare and Medicaid on medical facilities ===
The main influence on American healthcare system in the USA has the Medicare for All Act written in 2003. It was transformed in 2019 so it was more efficient.

Medicare and Medicaid are mostly preferred in rural areas, where there is also highest concentration of not-insured patients. Therefore, medical facilities have a much higher percentage of Medicare and Medicaid users and form a significant part of their income.

Because there is a low presence of private insured patience, rural hospitals become dependent on these programs.

A change of law in 2019 promised to change the percentage difference between private payers and the state-insured. That means that revenues of rural hospitals would increase. But on the other hand, there could be caused a loss in revenues of urban hospitals, which budgets could therefore decrease.

Another big change was that billing would be united into one single-payer healthcare system which was supposed to decrease administrative costs approximately by 50%.

=== Benefits and losses of cost-shifting ===
Cost-shifting is perceived as the most beneficial for users of Medicare and Medicaid and for people who are not insured at all. It is likely that for users of Medicare and Medicaid could be in total paid lesser money in comparison with those, who pay classical insurance or are willing to pay on the spot. So, there could be caused a loss in a margin.

From former paragraph follows that patients, who are insured or pay on the spot, pay for their own treatment. But because there is already a loss, these patients have to pay also for the others. So, it is not beneficial for them.

=== Economics of cost-shifting ===
Cost-shifting implies price discrimination and price discrimination will be applicable if the pricing system allows it. Of the three conventional pricing models in the health care industry, including individual negotiation, collective negotiation, and unilateral pricing, only price discrimination can be implemented in the individual negotiation model. A negotiable pricing regime has resulted in an opaque system in which payers with market power force weaker payers to cover disproportionate shares of providers’ fixed costs or providers simply succeed in charging higher prices when they can. However, some evidence suggests that hospital markets with relatively slow growth in Medicare inpatient hospital payment rates also had relatively slow growth in private hospital payment rates during 1995-2009. Using regression analyses, It is found that a 10 percent reduction in Medicare payment rates led to an estimated reduction in private payment rates of 3 percent or 8 percent, depending on the statistical model used, a result that somehow contradicts the cost-shifting. It means cost-shifting is not a common occurrence and can only persist in a market in which private payers are not price-sensitive, and entry is limited. Under these conditions, the hospital can sometimes afford not to profit maximize, a prerequisite for cost-shifting. nevertheless, the shift of costs by a provider is not a solid concept that has a status of zero and one but has a degree of applicability which means in markets the cost-shifting will be the largest if in which a hospital has the greatest relative market power. This means it will happen if the market power of a hospital in the provider side is larger relative to the market power of any given insurer or support program in the insurance side.

== See also ==
Cost externalizing
