= Higher Education Price Index =

The Higher Education Price Index (HEPI) is a measure of the inflation rate applicable to United States higher education. HEPI measures the average relative level in the prices of a fixed market basket of goods and services typically purchased by colleges and universities through current-fund educational and general expenditures, excluding expenditures for research. Educational and general expenditures include the functions of instruction and departmental research, extension and public services, educational programs such as workshops and instructional institutes supported by sponsors outside the institution, student services, general administration and expenses, staff benefits, libraries, and operation and maintenance of the physical plant. Sponsored research, sales and services of education departments, and auxiliary enterprises are not priced by HEPI. The index is calculated on a fiscal year basis ending each June 30, by the Commonfund Institute, a branch of Commonfund, a non-profit organization devoted to the management of college and university endowments.

== History and status ==
"Dr. D. Kent Halstead is credited with first developing the HEPI for the U.S. Department of Health, Education and Welfare (the precursor to the Department of Education) in 1975. Halstead argued that colleges and universities needed a new price index which more closely matched their expenditure patterns, going so far as to declare such an index to be 'far superior to substitute proxy indexes such as the Consumer Price Index or the gross national product (GNP) explicit deflator which are intended for entirely different purposes.'"

Throughout the years, Halstead continued to update the HEPI.

Since 2005, HEPI has been maintained by the Commonfund Institute, and it relies upon eight separate “cost factors” to construct the overall index. These factors are: faculty salaries, administrative salaries, clerical salaries, service employee salaries, fringe benefits, miscellaneous services, supplies and materials, and utilities.

In 2005, Commonfund Institute assumed responsibility for the index and the proprietary model used to calculate HEPI's values from Research Associates of Washington, D.C. In 2007, in keeping with its commitment to improving and expanding the index, Commonfund Institute inaugurated two additional HEPI services: HEPI calculated by type of institution for six different categories of public and private colleges and universities, and the monthly release, beginning in January of each year, of a forecast of HEPI for the coming fiscal year end.

In 2009, two further improvements were introduced, aligning the estimates and the final HEPI calculation with the July–June academic fiscal year and making available HEPI calculated by region. HEPI forecasts are provided monthly from January through June of each year. The HEPI report is published using the July HEPI figure, which may be subject to a further small adjustment when the last of the underlying data items are finalized in November.

== Five characteristics ==
HEPI has five critical characteristics that should be kept in mind when using it:

1. HEPI measures general inflation affecting all colleges and universities in the sector, not any specific institution.
2. In measuring average prices, HEPI reflects the quality of typically employed commodities. Any institutional departure in real expenditure from these averages represents a quality differential.
3. HEPI measures price changes for a fixed market basket of goods and services, so it does not account for the budgetary needs of institutions to buy more or better items to meet enrollment expansion, quality improvement, and competition.
4. The market basket has remained fixed over the years, which means that the index assumes a typical budget weighting of, for example, the number of gallons of fuel oil versus the number of professors.
5. Specialized indices for specific geographic regions and types of institution are included in the annual HEPI Report, but because the data series for which specialized information is available account for less than half of the factor weightings in the HEPI equation, they are of necessity approximations and should be used accordingly.

== Methodology ==
=== Calculation ===
From 1961 to 2001, HEPI was based on the price data for 25 budget components organized into eight categories – more than 100 items in all. From fiscal year 2002 on, HEPI has been calculated using a regression formula.

The weighting of each expenditure category is determined by regression analysis (though it appears as though a sample of just 41 colleges is used) that essentially reports the share of total spending for each category. The heaviest weights accompany faculty and clerical salaries and fringe benefits, reflecting their relatively large share in college and university budgets.”

The regression-based index values are essentially equal to those resulting from complete data. The R-squared value for the regression is .999997809. Regression-calculated HEPI values are not likely to vary from fully compiled values by more than 0.1 parts out of 200.0 or ± 0.05%.

=== Enhanced methodology ===
Beginning in 2009, the estimates and the final HEPI calculation were calculated using data series that were entirely aligned with the July–June academic fiscal year. Prior to that, the index had been calculated using data drawn from data series with various monthly endpoints. The resulting timing differences in the underlying data had sometimes led HEPI to seem too high or too low relative to the Consumer Price Index (CPI). Adoption of the improved methodology led to a restatement of HEPI for the period 2002–2008.

HEPI has useful tools for measuring inflation – but they have to be used appropriately:

- HEPI is useful as an overall measure of inflation affecting the higher education sector, just as consumers everywhere use the national Consumer Price Index (CPI) as a general measure of family purchasing power.
- When HEPI is used in an educational context to adjust faculty and other college and university personnel salaries, it does not result in constant purchasing power—a calculation more closely related to CPI. The HEPI no longer contained this disclaimer in 2015, however.

== 21st century values ==
The annual report from the Commonfund Institute usually contains data for all years since 2014. It is available for free download from the Institute.

- 2025 Fiscal year:
- 2024 Fiscal year:
- 2023 Fiscal year: 4.0%
- 2022 Fiscal year: 5.2%
- 2021 Fiscal year: 2.7%
- 2020 Fiscal year: 1.9%
- 2019 Fiscal year: 3.0%
- 2018 Fiscal year: 2.6%
- 2017 Fiscal year: 3.0%
- 2016 Fiscal year: 1.5%
- 2015 Fiscal year: 2.0%
- 2014 Fiscal year: 3.0%
- 2013 Fiscal year: 1.6%
- 2012 Fiscal year: 1.7%
- 2011 Fiscal year: 2.3%
- 2010 Fiscal year: 0.9%
- 2009 Fiscal year: 2.3%
- 2008 Fiscal year: 3.6% (as compared to a 3.7% increase in the Consumer Price Index. This marked the first time since 1995 that the Higher Education Price Index for a year was less than the Consumer Price Index.)
- 2007 Fiscal year: 3.4% (as compared to a 2.6% increase in the Consumer Price Index.
- 2006 Fiscal year: 5.0%
- 2005 Fiscal year: 3.6%
- 2004 Fiscal year: 4.6%
- 2003 Fiscal year: 2.9%
- 2002 Fiscal year: 4.1%
