= Sexual and gender minorities =

Individuals with a minority sexual orientation or gender identity

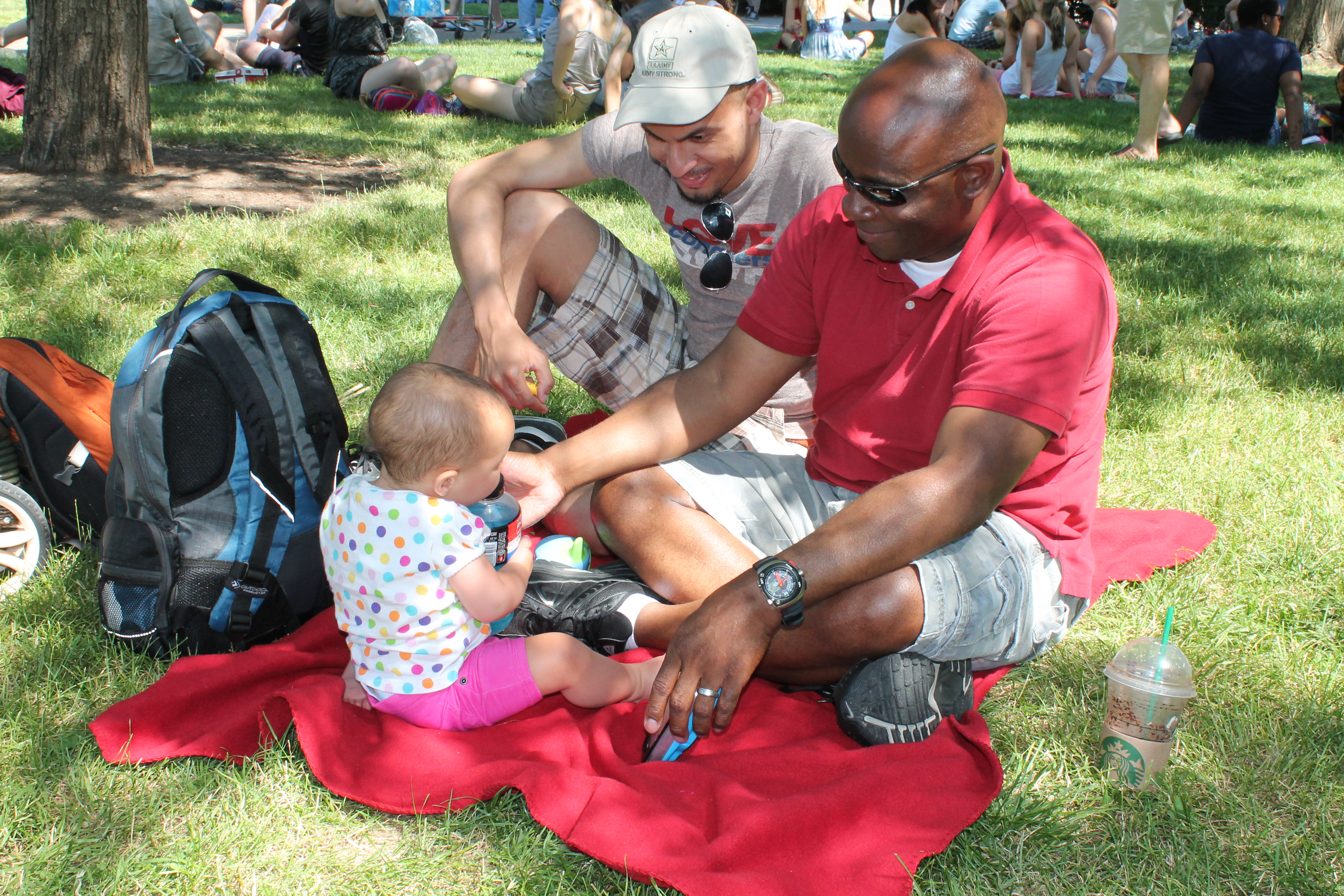
Two fathers with their child

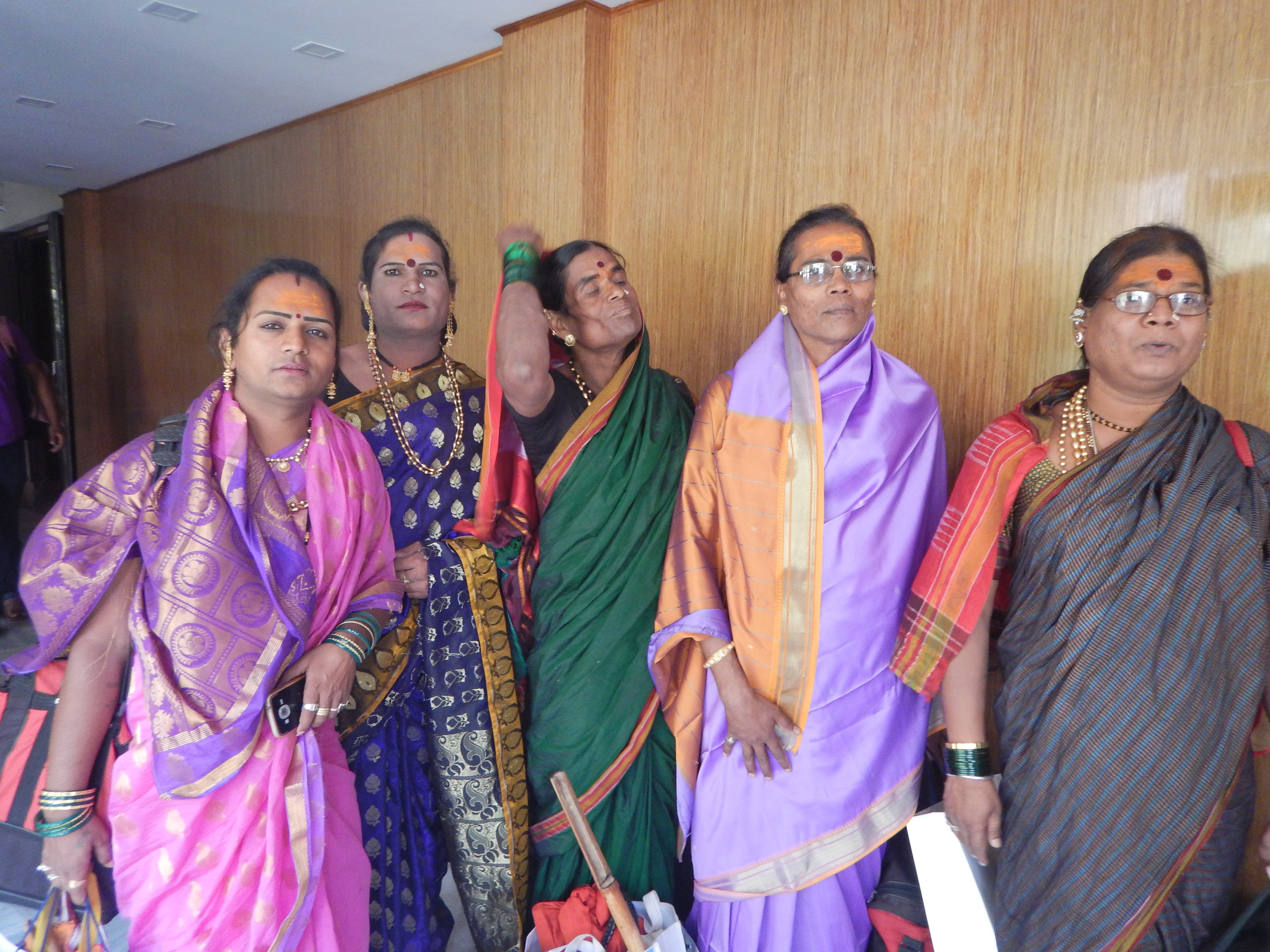
Jogappa is a transgender community in Karnataka and Andhra Pradesh. They are traditional folk singers and dancers.

The rainbow flag is the symbol for the LGBTQ community that seeks to represent sexual and gender minorities who do or may wish to identify as part of the community.

Sexual and gender minorities (SGM) (Note: In Sinosphere, denote "sexual and gender minorities" as follows: 性少數 (Simplified Chinese: 性少数); 性少數者 (Korean: 성소수자); 性的少數者 (Japanese: 性的少数者); 少數性別 (Vietnamese: thiểu số tính dục); 少數[者] means "minority" and the 性[別] includes both "sexual" and "gender." It is sometimes paraphrased as "LGBTQ".) comprise individuals whose sexual identity, sexual orientation, sexual behavior, or gender identity differ from the majority of the surrounding society. Sexual minorities include homosexual, bisexual, asexual , and other non-heterosexual people, Gender minorities include transgender and non-binary people. Gender, sexual and romantic minorities (GSRM) includes individuals of a minority romantic orientation such as aromanticism. Sexual and gender minorities is a synonym for LGBTQ people. In 2015, the United States National Institutes of Health described SGM as an "umbrella term that encompasses populations included in the acronym "LGBTI" (lesbian, gay, bisexual, transgender and intersex), and those whose sexual orientation or gender identity varies. It includes those who may not self-identify as any of the immediate letters of LGBTI (e.g., queer, questioning, two-spirit, asexual, men who have sex with men, women who have sex with women, gender variant), or those who have a specific medical condition affecting reproductive development (e.g., individuals with differences or disorders of sex development, who sometimes identify as intersex)."

Numerous professional and academic institutions use sexual and gender minorities or similar terminology. In 2015, the US National Institutes of Health announced the formation of the Sexual and Gender Minority Research Office.

== Origins ==
The term sexual minority most likely was coined in the late 1960s under the influence of Lars Ullerstam's book The Erotic Minorities: A Swedish View, which is strongly in favor of tolerance and empathy to paraphilias such as pedophilia and uncommon sexualities in which people were labeled "sex criminals". The term was used as analogous to ethnic minority.

Scientist Ritch Savin-Williams supports using the term in order to accurately describe adolescent youths who may not identify as any common culturally defined sexual identity label but have attractions towards those of the same anatomical sex as themselves.

== Terminology and usage ==
In New Zealand, New Zealand Human Rights Commission uses the Edison "rights of sexual and gender minorities" to discuss LGBT rights.

In India, the Constitutional Bench of the Supreme Court of India, when decriminalizing homosexuality in the case of Navtej Singh Johar v. Union of India (2018), said:

Individuals belonging to sexual and gender minorities experience discrimination, stigmatization, and, in some cases, denial of care on account of their sexual orientation and gender identity. However, it is important to note that 'sexual and gender minorities' do not constitute a homogenous group, and experiences of social exclusion, marginalization, and discrimination, as well as specific health needs, vary considerably. Nevertheless, these individuals are united by one factor - that their exclusion, discrimination and marginalization is rooted in societal heteronormativity and society's pervasive bias towards gender binary and opposite-gender relationships, which marginalizes and excludes all non-heteronormative sexual and gender identities.

In the US, the term "sexual and gender minority" has been adopted by the National Institutes of Health, the Centers for Medicare & Medicaid Services and the UCLA Williams Institute, which studies SGM law and policy. Duke University and the University of California San Francisco both have prominent sexual and gender minority health programs. An NIH paper recommends the term SGM because it is inclusive of "those who may not self-identify as LGBT ... or those who have a specific medical condition affecting reproductive development". A publication from the White House Office of Management and Budget states, "We believe that SGM is more inclusive, because it includes persons not specifically referenced by the identities listed in LGBT."

A UK government paper favors SGM because initials like LGBTIQ+ stand for terms that, especially outside the Global North, are "not necessarily inclusive of local understandings and terms used to describe sexual and gender minorities". An example of usage outside the Global North is the Constitution of Nepal, which identifies "gender and sexual minorities" as a protected class.

Some people advocate the related term "minority sexual and gender identities" (MSGI), coined in 2000 for the purpose of explicitly including all people who are not cisgender and heterosexual or "gender, sexual, and romantic minorities" (GSRM), which is more explicitly inclusive of minority romantic orientations, but those have not been widely adopted either.

== Associated health and social issues ==
=== Stress ===
Social issues may lead to possible health and psychological issues, especially in youth. Sexual minorities face increased stress due to stigma. Stigma-related stress creates elevated coping regulation and social and cognitive processes leading to risk for psychopathology. Examples of stigma-related stress that sexual minorities encounter throughout their lives are homophobia, rejection, and discrimination which may lead them to conceal their identities. Research has shown that about 80% of these people reported harassment. These experiences increase the chance of developing major depression and generalized anxiety disorder, including an increased chance of drugs and alcohol abuse.

=== Risky behavior ===
The Centers for Disease Control (CDC) published its 2015 study of large cohorts of ninth to twelfth grade students across the US 100 health behaviors were shown to put LGB students at risk for health consequences. Sexual minority students engage in more risky behaviors when compared with nonsexual minority students. Some students "had no sexual contact [and] were excluded from analyses on sexual behaviors [including] female students who had sexual contact with only females [and] were excluded from analyses on condom use and birth control use..." Also excluded were "male students who had sexual contact with only males [and] were excluded from analyses on birth control use."

=== Development ===
Based on studies of adolescents, it is concluded that sexual minorities are similar to heterosexual adolescents in developmental needs and concerns. However, research has suggested that sexual minority youth (more specifically LGBT youth) are more susceptible to psychological and health issues than heterosexual youth.

=== Epidemiology ===
Sexual minorities tend to use alternative and complementary medicine as alternative methods of addressing their health needs more often than heterosexuals. Sexual minority women have a higher incidence of asthma, obesity, arthritis and cardiovascular disease than other groups.

Adolescent sexual minorities report a higher incidence of the following when compared to heterosexual students:

- having feelings of not being safe travelling to and from school or in school
- not going to school because they did not feel safe.
- being forced to do sexual things they did not want to do by someone they were dating or going out with one or more times during the 12 months (touching, kissing, or physically forced to have sexual intercourse)
- having had sexual intercourse
- having sex for the first time before age 13
- having had sex with at least four other people
- not using birth control
- having had experienced sexual violence

When compared to the general population, sexual minorities have a higher risk for self-injury. The treatment of aging sexual minorities seems to be influenced more by ageism. Support for aging sexual minorities appears to be common.

=== Discrimination ===
When gay, lesbian, and bisexual adults reported being discriminated against, 42 percent credited it to their sexual orientation. This discrimination was positively associated with both harmful effects on quality of life and indicators of psychiatric morbidity. Furthermore, those who were bisexuals and homosexuals compared to heterosexuals, tended to report to have one of the five psychiatric disorders examined. It was evident that the discrimination these homosexual individuals experienced had a negative impact leading to psychological changes.

Sexual and gender minorities may experience forced migration because of state persecution, discrimination, violence, or threats related to their sexual orientation, gender identity or expression. These circumstances may lead individuals with no options but to leave their homes or countries of origin and seek protection elsewhere. In some cases, individuals may apply for asylum or refugee protection based on a well-founded fear of persecution related to their sexual or gender minority status. During transit and displacement, including in refugee camps, SGM migrants may remain at risk of violence and abuse. These risks may be compounded by limited access to appropriate healthcare and support services. Upon reaching the host country, sexual and gender minority forced migrants may face additional challenges during asylum and refugee status determination procedures. Applicants may encounter rigorous evidentiary requirements and subjective credibility assessments. Evaluations may include legal and social conditions in the applicant's country of origin. Individuals may also be reluctant to disclose their sexual orientation or gender identity to authorities because of stigma, fear of discrimination, or previous experiences of persecution. Following resettlement SGM forced migrants may continue to experience challenges, including xenophobia, discrimination, racism, social isolation based on both their SGM status and migrant or refugee status.

== In the media ==
Sexual minorities are generally portrayed in the mass media as being ignored, trivialized, or condemned. The term symbolic annihilation accounts for their lack of characterization due to not fitting into the white, heterosexual, vanilla type lifestyle. It has been suggested that online media has developed into a space in which sexual minorities may use "social artillery". This description centers on how social networking and connections to oppose instances of homophobia. Still, some individuals have made their way into the media through television and music. Television shows such as The Ellen DeGeneres Show and Modern Family star individuals who are open about their non-heterosexual lifestyles. In music, people like Sam Smith and Sia have created songs that express their emotions and sexuality with a number of followers. While sexual minorities do have a place in the media, it is often critiqued that they are still limited in their representations. In shows, if a character is gay, they are often a shallow character that is only present for comic relief or as a plot twist. Compared to a heteronormative counterpart, the sexual minority is often a mere side-kick. However, since the integration of actors, musicians, and characters of sexual minorities, the idea of non-normativity has become more normalized in society.

== Cultural issues ==
Current and past research has been "skewed toward SM [sexual minority] men—and is disproportionately focused on HIV and other sexually transmitted infections." From 1989 to 2011, numerous grants for research were sponsored and funded by the US National Institutes of Health but funded research for sexual minorities and health made up 0.1% of all funded studies. Most research has been directed toward gay and bisexual men. Women sexual minority studies accounted for 13.5%.

Sexual minorities in South Africa have sexual-orientation-related health inequities when compared to other countries. One of the higher incidents of sexual violence directed toward women of a sexual minority occurs in South Africa. Women of color who are living in low-income, urban areas notably are targeted. The perpetrators of sexual violence believe that they are "correcting the women" and that their actions will cure them of their homosexuality.

== See also ==
- Aromanticism
- Ascribed characteristics
- Bisexual community
- Gender and sexual diversity
- Human female sexuality
- Human male sexuality
- Human sexuality
- LGBTQ people
- Minority group
- Queer
- Sexual minorities in Japan
- Sexual minorities in Sri Lanka
- Sexuality and gender identity-based cultures
- Tamil sexual minorities
- Fictosexuality
