= Baby boom =

Period marked by a significant increase of birth rate

A baby boom is a period marked by a significant increase of births. This demographic phenomenon is usually an ascribed characteristic within the population of a specific nation or culture. Baby booms are caused by various fertility factors. The best-known baby boom occurred in the mid-twentieth century, sometimes considered to have started in the aftermath of World War II, from the late 1940s to the early 1960s. People born during this period are often called baby boomers.

== Africa ==
"According to the new UNICEF report, almost 2 billion babies will be born in Africa between 2015 and 2050 and the 2 main driving forces behind this surge in births and children are continued high fertility rates and rising numbers of women able to have children of their own."

By 2050, Africa is predicted to account for about 55% of all births in the world, 40% of all children under the age of five, and 37% of all children worldwide (under 18). Africa will become more crowded as its population continues to grow, considering the continent is predicted to grow from 8 people per square kilometer in 1950 to 39 in 2015, and to around 80 by the middle of the century.

The HIV/AIDS crisis in Africa has contributed to a population boom. Aid money used for contraception has been diverted since the start of the AIDS crisis in Africa into fighting HIV, which has led to far more births than AIDS has killed.

Africa accounted for one out of every nine births in the world in 1950. It is predicted that they will account for approximately one in every three global births by the year 2030. Africa would account for almost half of all births by the end of the century.

== Canada ==
=== Indigenous people in Canada ===
Until the 1960s, the Aboriginal population rose steadily. The child mortality rate started to decline steadily in the 1960s, due to the increased access to health care. Throughout the 1960s, the fertility rate remained high, resulting in the Aboriginal baby boom peaking in 1967 – about ten years after the postwar baby boom in Canada.

While Aboriginal fertility has remained higher than the overall Canadian birth rate, it has decreased from four times in the 1960s to one-and-a-half times today. According to Statistics Canada, demographic change was just a part of the reason for the increase in Aboriginal population in the last half of the century, with more complete census taking and increased numbers of people identifying as Aboriginal also playing a role.

=== Appearance of Generation "X," "Y," and "Z" in Canada ===
Generation X refers to the birth rate decline after the mid-20th century baby boom. Author Douglas Coupland, who coined the term Generation X, defined it as children born 1960 and after. High unemployment and uneven income distribution welcomed Generation X, giving them little opportunity to produce the next baby boom.

In 2011, the children of baby boomers made up 27% of the total population; this category was called Generation Y, or the "baby boom echo". The fertility rate of the generations after the baby boomers dropped as a result of demographic changes such as increasing divorce and separation rates, female labour force participation, and rapid technological change.

The echo generation's children, known as Generation Z, are people born after 1994, or after the invention of the Internet, making up over 7.3 million people in Canada born between 1993 and 2011.

== Israel ==
Israel has been in a constant baby boom since it was founded, with the highest fertility rate in the OECD at 3.1 children per woman. In addition to having the highest fertility rate among developed nations, it is the only developed country to have never had a sub-replacement fertility rate. Israel's baby boom began in 1947, a year before independence, when the fertility rate among the Yishuv, or Jewish population of what was then Mandatory Palestine, began to rise dramatically as a result of the aftereffects of the Holocaust and expectations of Jewish independence.

== Ireland ==
=== Post-recession baby boom ===
The population pyramid of Ireland in 2023. From ages 5 to 15, there appears to be a significant increase in births, which is likely due to the post-recession baby boom observed in the late 2000s and early 2010s.

Ireland has a much younger population compared to Europe overall, with one in four people under age 15. This is likely due to the baby boom experienced in the late 2000s and early 2010s, after the Great Recession. The number of births in Ireland reached a 118-year high in 2009 when the economy experienced its worst year on record. The number of births had remained stable with 74,650 babies born in 2012, higher than the 65,600 average during the Celtic Tiger (1995–2007), despite the struggle to emerge from financial crisis.

== Japan ==
The number of births and TFR in Japan

=== First baby boom ===
In Japan, the first baby boom occurred between 1947 and 1949. (Note: Although there are no official statistics for 1945 and 1946, the number of births in 1946 is estimated to be around 1.6 million. Therefore, it is not appropriate to set the beginning of the baby boom to 1946.) (Note: Changes in the number of births in Japan Teikoku-shoin Co., Ltd. The trend is the same, although there are annual numbers that are slightly different from official vital statistics. Note that the number of births in 1946 is 15.7 million.) The number of births in this period exceeded 2.5 million every year, bringing the total number of births to about 8 million. The 2.69 million births in 1949 are the most ever in postwar statistics. (Note: The number of births in 1949 does not include the number of births in Okinawa prefecture before return to the mainland.) The cohort born in this period is called the "baby boom generation" (団塊の世代, dankai no sedai; means "the generation of nodule").

=== Second baby boom ===
A period of more than two million annual births from 1971 to 1974, with the number of births in 1973 peaking at 2.09 million, is referred to as the second baby boom. However, unlike the first boom, this increase in the number of births is an increase in the number of births not accompanied by an increase in the total fertility rate. The people born during this period are often called "baby boom juniors" (団塊ジュニア, dankai junia; means "the juniors of the generation of nodule").

== Romania ==
- Decreței: (1967–1989), A ban on abortion and contraception caused a baby boom in Romania, leading to overcrowded hospitals. According to an article in the Chicago Tribune on December 26, 1967, a doctor had to beg a woman to give birth at home due to overcrowding at the hospital. The article also said that "pregnant women were having to share hospital beds, and sickly babies were being put into oxygen tents in groups." The baby boom in Romania caused problems that began affecting the health of the nation. Before its ban in 1967, abortion was the only form of birth control. The ethno-nationalistic policies of Romania's leader, Nicolae Ceaușescu, further contributed to the baby boom. To encourage people in dominant ethnic groups to have more children, the Romanian Government established financial incentives to have children, including a tax for anyone over 25 without a child. This motivated many people to have children at a younger age, and with ethnic Romanian partners, leading to a surge in births, which later dropped to 14.3 births per 1000 individuals by the 1980s. In an effort to increase birth rates, Ceaușescu changed the legal age to marry to 15, launched media campaigns, and mandated monthly gynecological examinations of all women of childbearing age. This caused a near-fivefold increase in spending on incentives, but the birth rate decreased by 40%.

== Russia ==
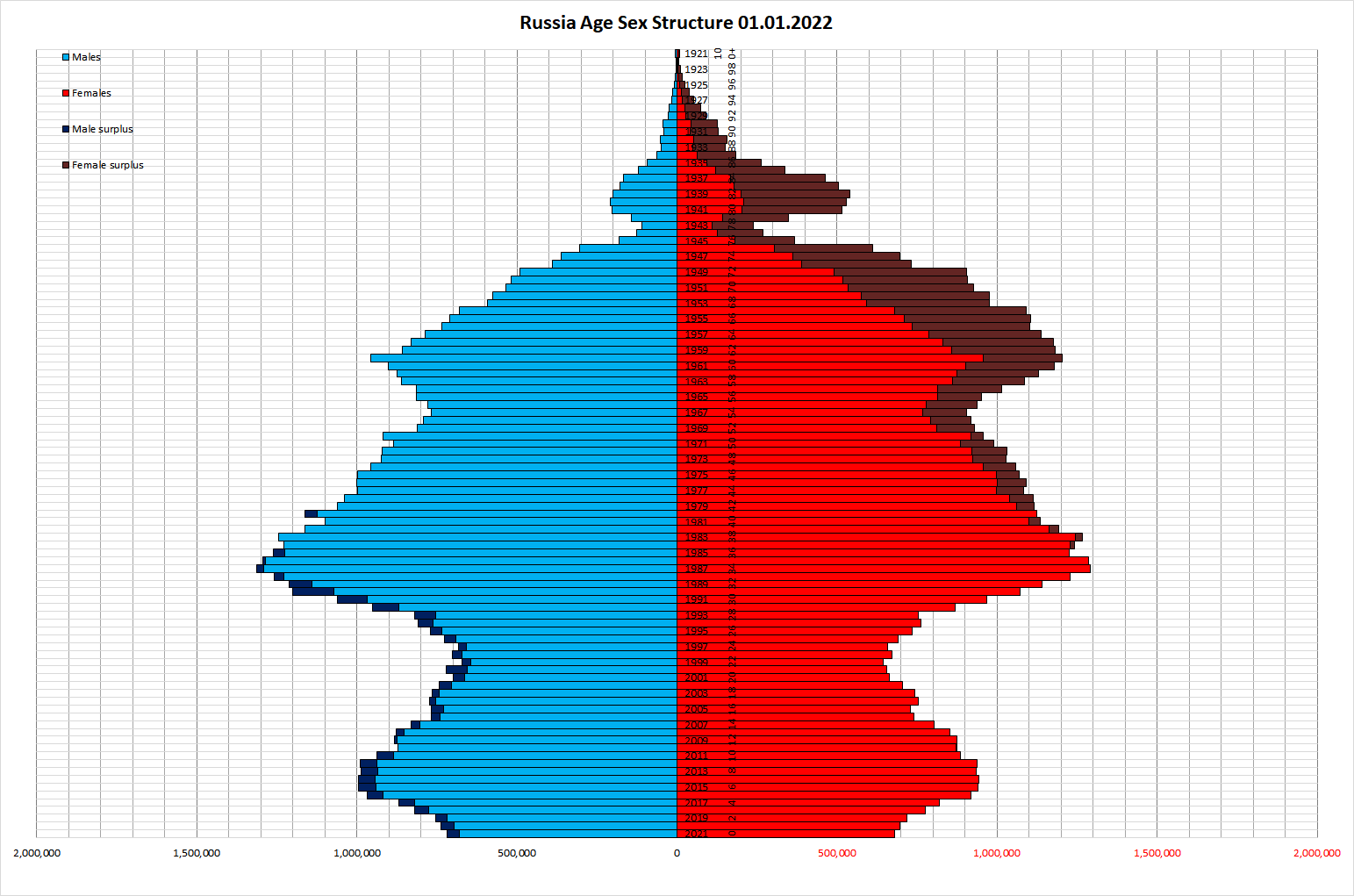
A population pyramid of Russia, before the Russian Invasion of Ukraine. From the ages 5–15, there appears to be a significant increase in people, which is likely due to the baby boom observed in the mid-2000s to the late-2010s, similar to Ukraine.

The number of annual Russian births hit a low in the 1990s and early 2000s, following the collapse of the Soviet Union and the 1998 financial crisis. However, the following years saw the birth rate rise rapidly. By 2012, the number of births outnumbered deaths for the first time since the Soviet Union. To many Russians, this was not only a sign of economic prosperity, but also a recovery from the poverty and social decline following the downfall of the Soviet Union.

== Ukraine ==
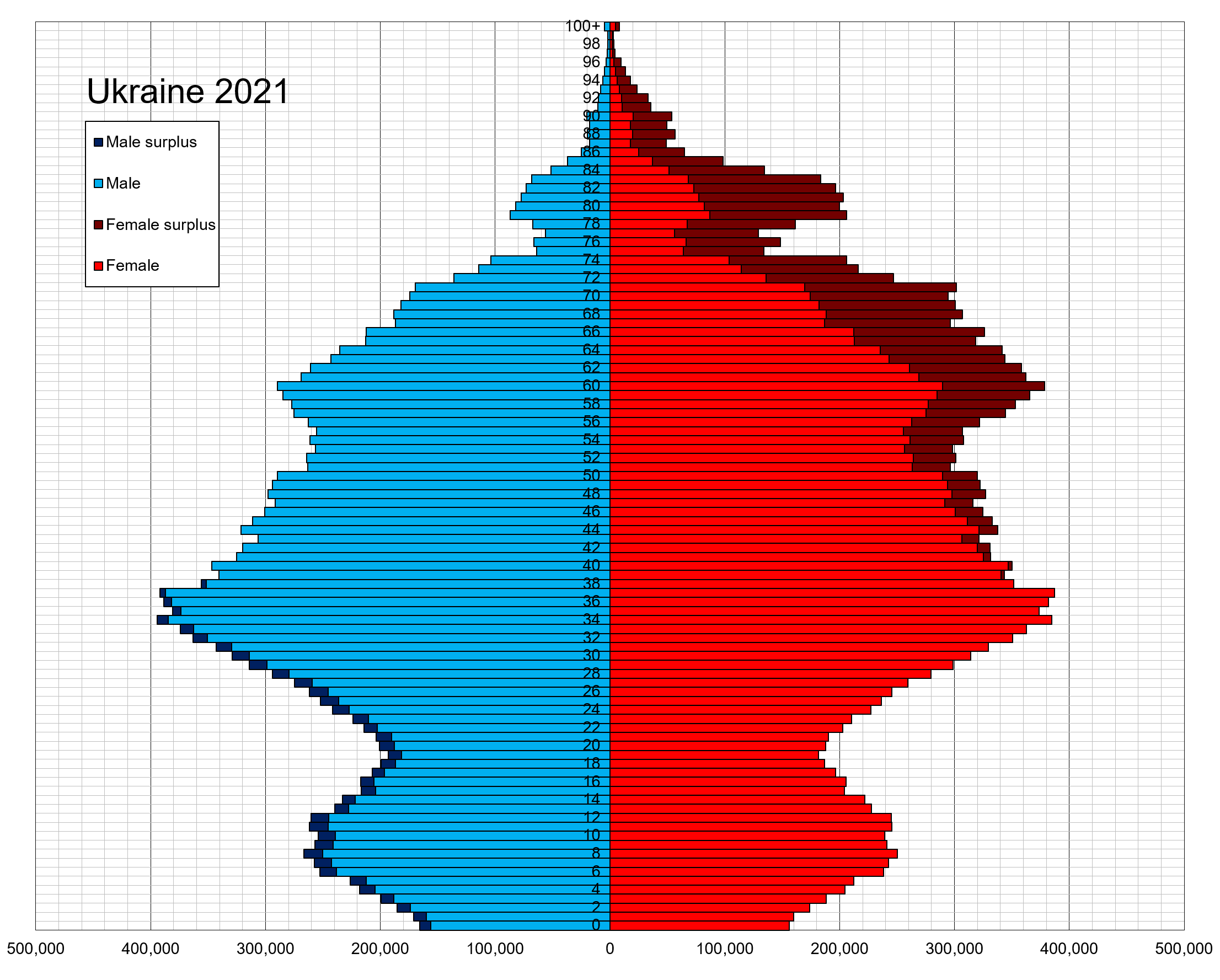
A population pyramid of Ukraine, before the Russian Invasion of Ukraine. From the ages 5–15, there appears to be a significant swell in people, which is likely due to the baby boom observed in the mid-2000s to the mid-2010s, similar to Russia.

After the fall of the Soviet Union in 1991, the Ukrainian birth rate reached a low of 1.14 births per women in 2003. Following the Orange Revolution, the total fertility rate gradually elevated, eventually to a peak of 1.49 births per women in 2014. However, this did not last, as the birth rate rapidly diminished following the Invasion of Crimea in 2014.

== United States ==
The baby boom birth years from the mid 1940s through the mid 1960s extended an early-1940s increase in live births following lows in the Great Depression.

The term "baby boom" is often used to refer specifically to the post–World War II (1946–1964) baby boom in the United States and Europe. In the US the number of annual births exceeded 2 per 100 women (or approximately 1% of the total population size). An estimated 78.3 million Americans were born during this period.

Since the beginning of the 20th century there were several baby booms:

- Post–World War II baby boom (Boomers): Although when the baby boom exactly started and ended is debated, most people agree that the baby boom occurred around 1946 and 1964. This generation of "baby boomers" was the result of a strong postwar economy, in which Americans felt confident they would be able to support a larger number of children. Boomers also influenced the economy as a core marketing demographic for products tied to their age group, from toys to records.
- Millennials: are mostly the children of baby boomers and are commonly considered to be born from the early 1980s to the mid or late 1990s. They are considered to be the first "digital natives", and thus have a large influence on social media, and the video game industry. Now that many millennials are becoming older, their political power will likely surpass baby boomers within a few years, if it did not happen already.

== United Kingdom ==
The baby boomers are commonly defined as the generation born after the Second World War, generally from 1946 to 1964. However, this definition of baby boomers is based on American demographic trends which saw a surge in births post Second World War that was sustained into the 1960s. In the UK, the post Second World War surge in births was confined to a sharp spike in 1946, after which the number of births dropped again. Then the post-World War babies started having their babies, giving rise to the births that can be seen across the 1960s, who became identified as GenX from 1966 and onwards. As of 2021, baby boomers make up about 20% of the British population, which is about 14 million people. Baby boomers today are certainly one of the most powerful and wealthy generations in the United Kingdom. For example, in 2020, growth in online shopping was led by baby boomers.

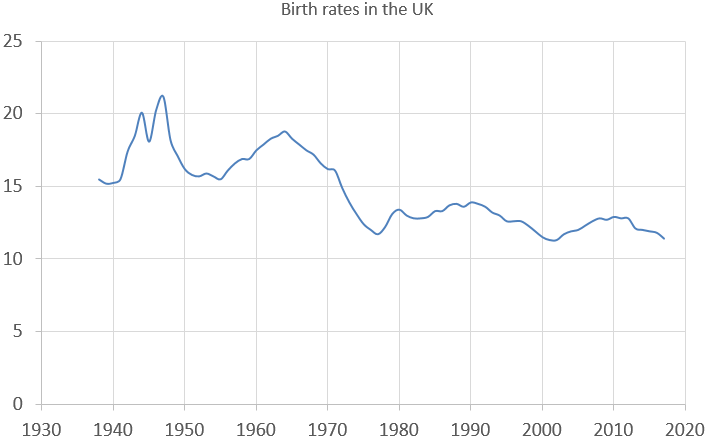
A chart showing the historical birth rate of the United Kingdom. A spike of births can be seen in 1946 and 1960s, reflecting the two baby booms.

== See also ==
- Agequake
- American social policy during the Second Red Scare
- Death rates in the 20th century
- Generation
- Gray ceiling
- Population growth
- Marshall Plan — reconstruction investment in Europe in 1948 – 1951
