= Generation X =

Cohort born from 1965 to 1980

Generation X, often shortened to Gen X, is the demographic cohort following the baby boomers and preceding millennials. Researchers and popular media often use the mid-1960s as its starting birth years and the late 1970s to early 1980s as its ending birth years, with the generation generally defined as people born from 1965 to 1980. By this definition and U.S. census data, there are 65.2 million Gen Xers in the United States as of 2019. Most Gen Xers are the children of the Silent Generation and older baby boomers, and many are the parents of millennials, Generation Z and older Generation Alpha.

As children in the 1970s and 1980s, a time of shifting societal values, Gen Xers were sometimes called the "Latchkey Generation", a reference to their returning as children from school to an empty home and using a key to let themselves in. This was a result of what is now called free-range parenting, increasing divorce rates, and increased maternal participation in the workforce before widespread availability of childcare options outside the home. Video games, via both arcades and home consoles, were also a major part of childhood entertainment for the first time among Xers.

As adolescents and young adults in the 1980s and 1990s, Xers were dubbed the "MTV Generation" (a reference to the music video channel) and sometimes characterized as slackers, cynical, and disaffected. Some of the many cultural influences on Gen X youth included a proliferation of musical genres with strong social-tribal identity, such as dance-pop, new wave, punk rock, hip-hop, heavy metal, alternative rock, rave, and grunge. Film was also a notable cultural influence, via both the birth of franchise mega-sequels and a proliferation of independent film (enabled in part by video). Politically, Generation X experienced the last days of communism in the Soviet Union and the Eastern Bloc countries of Central and Eastern Europe, witnessing the transition to capitalism in these regions during their youth. In much of the Western world, a similar time period was defined by a dominance of conservatism and free market economics.

In their midlife during the early 21st century, research describes Gen Xers as active, happy, and achieving a work–life balance. The cohort has also been more broadly described as entrepreneurial and productive in the workplace.

== Terminology ==
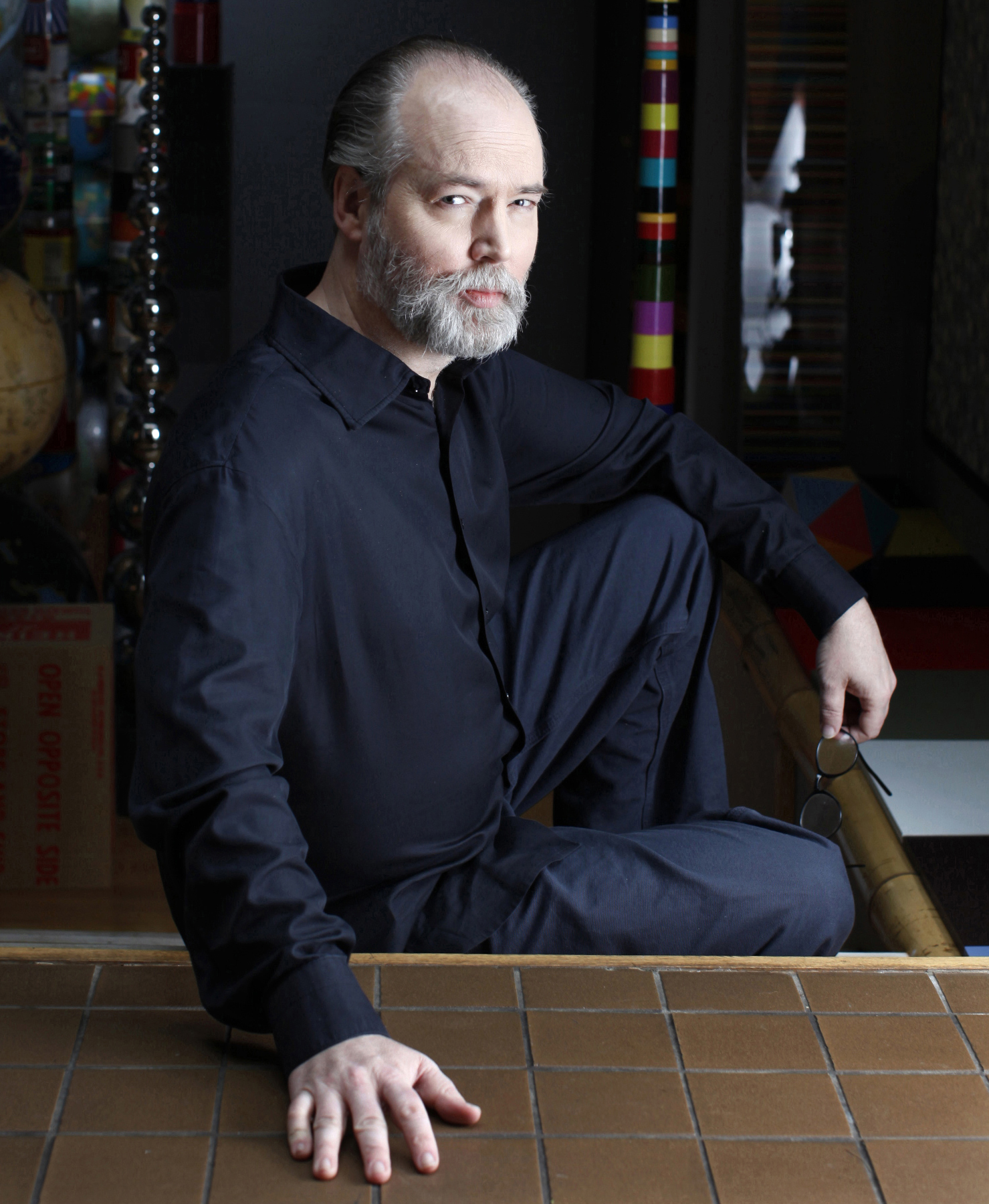
Douglas Coupland's 1991 novel Generation X: Tales for an Accelerated Culture popularized the term Generation X.

The term Generation X has been used at various times to describe alienated youth. In the early 1950s, Hungarian photographer Robert Capa first used Generation X as the title for a photo-essay about young men and women growing up immediately after World War II (later called the Silent Generation). The term first appeared in print in a December 1952 issue of Holiday magazine announcing its upcoming publication of Capa's photo-essay. In 1964, Jane Deverson and Charles Hamblett published the book Generation X, about British youth (who were older baby boomers at the time) and their culture. From 1976 to 1981, English musician Billy Idol (himself a younger boomer) used the term as the name of his punk rock band, as his mother had owned a copy of the 1964 book. These uses of the term appear to have no connection to Capa's photo-essay.

The term gained a modern application after the release of Canadian author Douglas Coupland's 1991 novel Generation X: Tales for an Accelerated Culture. The characters in the novel were born in the late 1950s and early 1960s, ironically making them younger baby boomers, or Generation Jones. In 1999, Coupland described his book as being about "the fringe of Generation Jones which became the mainstream of Generation X". In 1987, he had written a piece in Vancouver Magazine titled "Generation X" that was "the seed of what went on to become the book". Coupland initially claimed the term was derived from Billy Idol's band, but in 1995 he denied this connection, saying:

The book's title came not from Billy Idol's band, as many supposed, but from the final chapter of a funny sociological book on American class structure titled Class, by Paul Fussell. In his final chapter, Fussell named an "X" category of people who wanted to hop off the merry-go-round of status, money, and social climbing that so often frames modern existence.

Author William Strauss noted that around the time Coupland's novel was published the symbol "X" was prominent in popular culture, as the film Malcolm X was released in 1992, and that the name "Generation X" stuck. The "X" refers to an unknown variable or to a desire not to be defined. Strauss's coauthor Neil Howe noted the delay in naming this demographic cohort: "Over 30 years after their birthday, they didn't have a name. I think that's germane." Previously, the cohort had been called post-Boomers, Baby Busters (which refers to the drop in birth rates after the baby boom in the western world, particularly in the U.S.), the New Lost Generation, latchkey kids, the MTV Generation, and the 13th Generation (the 13th generation since American independence).

== Date and age range definitions ==
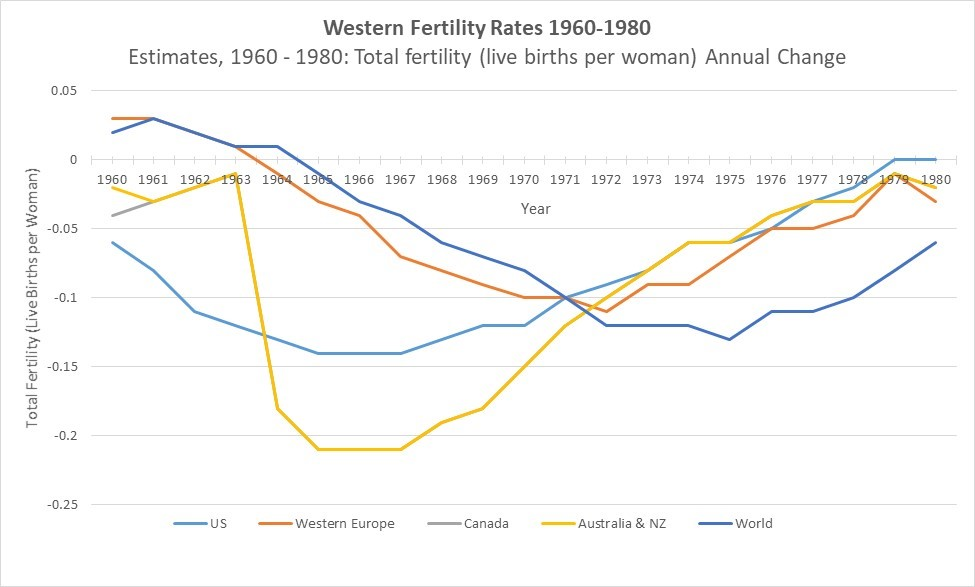
Western fertility rates, 1960–1980

Generation X is the demographic cohort following the post–World War II baby-boom, representing a generational change from the baby boomers. Many researchers and demographers use dates that correspond to the fertility-patterns in the population. For Generation X, in the U.S. (and broadly, in the Western world), the period begins at a time when fertility rates started to significantly decrease in the mid-1960s (due to increased access to birth control), until an upswing in the late 1970s and recovery at the start of the 1980s.

In the U.S., the Pew Research Center, a nonpartisan think tank, delineates a Generation X period of 1965–1980 which has gradually gained acceptance in academic circles. Moreover, although fertility rates are preponderant in the definition of start and end dates, the center remarks: "Generations are analytical constructs, it takes time for popular and expert consensus to develop as to the precise boundaries that demarcate one generation from another." Pew takes into account other factors, notably the labor market as well as a group's attitudinal and behavioral trends. Writing for Pew's Trend magazine in 2018, psychologist Jean Twenge observed that the "birth year boundaries of Gen X are debated but settle somewhere around 1965–1980". According to this definition, as of 2026 the oldest members of Generation X are 61 and the youngest are 45.

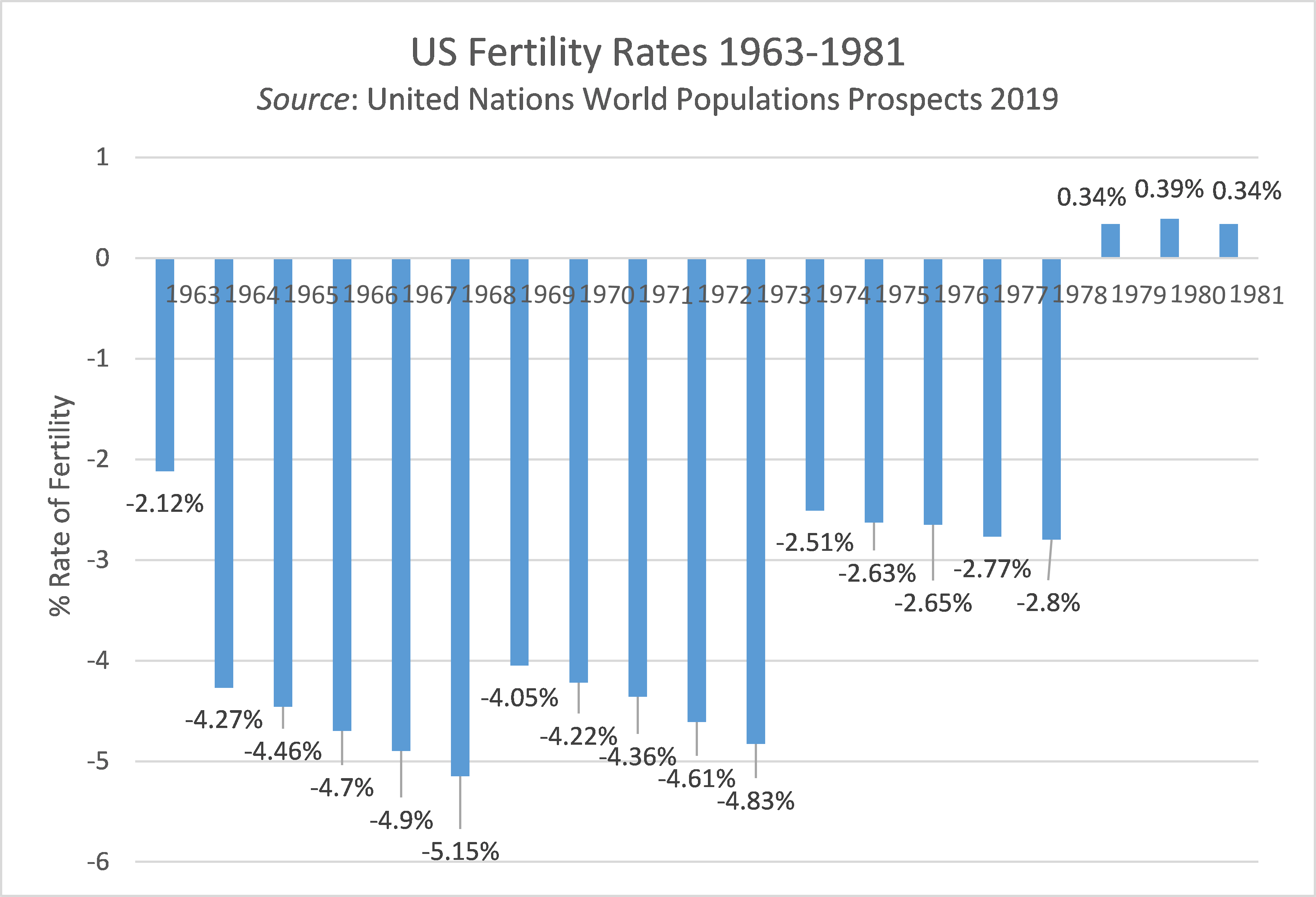
U.S. fertility rates, 1963–1981

Various media outlets, think tanks, and statistical organizations have cited or used the 1965–1980 definition, including the U.S. Federal Reserve Board, the U.S. Social Security Administration (SSA), The New York Times, The Washington Post, Gallup, and Time magazine. In their 2002 book When Generations Collide, Lynne Lancaster and David Stillman use 1965 to 1980, and in 2012 authors Jain and Pant also used 1965 to 1980.

U.S. authors William Strauss and Neil Howe define Generation X as those born between 1961 and 1981, and divide the cohort into two waves: the "Atari Wave" and "Nintendo Wave". In Australia, the McCrindle Research Center uses 1965–1979. The Brookings Institution, another U.S. think tank, sets the Gen X period as from 1965 to 1981. Statistics Canada and the UK's Resolution Foundation define Gen X as those born between 1966 and 1980. In his 1996 book Boom Bust & Echo: How to Profit from the Coming Demographic Shift, David Foot describes Generation X as late Boomers and includes those born between 1960 and 1966, while the "Bust Generation", those born between 1967 and 1979, is considered a separate generation.

People born in the latter half of the Baby Boom, from the late 1950s to the early 1960s, are sometimes called Generation Jones. People born in the Generation X/millennial cusp years of the late 1970s and early 1980s are sometimes called Xennials or the Oregon Trail Generation. These "microgenerations" share characteristics of both their adjacent generations.

== Demographics ==
=== United States ===
U.S. living adult generations, 2019. Only U.S. births are included; projected size can be higher because of immigration.

Generation X population numbers vary, depending on the date range used. In the U.S., using Census population projections, the Pew Research Center found that the Gen X population born from 1965 to 1980 numbered 65.2 million in 2019. The cohort is likely to overtake Boomers in 2028. In 2011, Jon Miller at the University of Michigan's Longitudinal Study of American Youth wrote, "Generation X refers to adults born between 1961 and 1981" and "includes 84 million people". In their 1991 book Generations, Howe and Strauss counted 88.5 million Gen Xers in the U.S.

==== Impact of family planning programs ====
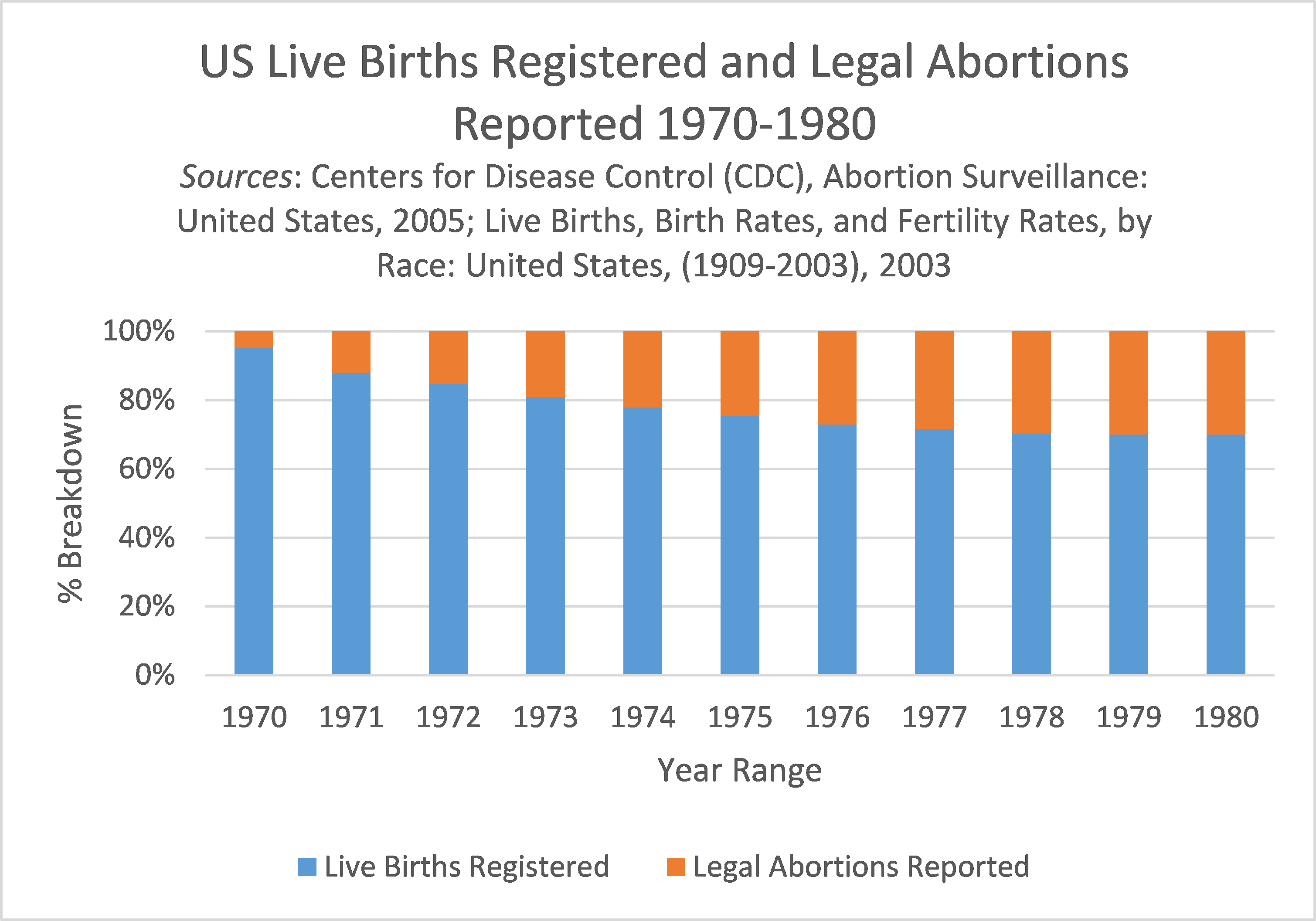
U.S. Live Births Registered and Legal Abortions Reported 1970–1980

The birth control pill, introduced in 1960 and further popularized in 1964, was one contributing factor of declining birth rates. Initially, the pill spread rapidly amongst married women as an approved treatment for menstrual disturbance. However, it was also found to prevent pregnancy and was prescribed as a contraceptive in 1964. "The pill", as it became commonly known, reached younger, unmarried college women in the late 1960s when state laws were amended and reduced the age of majority from 21 to ages 18–20. These policies are commonly referred to as the Early Legal Access (ELA) laws.

Another major factor was abortion, only available in a few states until its legalization in a 1973 US Supreme Court decision in Roe v. Wade. This was replicated elsewhere, with reproductive rights legislation passed, notably in the UK (1967), France (1975), West Germany (1976), New Zealand (1977), Italy (1978), and the Netherlands (1980). From 1973 to 1980, the abortion rate per 1,000 US women aged 15–44 increased from 16% to 29% with more than 9.6 million terminations of pregnancy practiced. Between 1970 and 1980, on average, for every 10 American citizens born, 3 were aborted. However, increased immigration during the same period of time helped to partially offset declining birth-rates and contributed to making Generation X an ethnically and culturally diverse demographic cohort.

==== Parental lineage ====
Generally, Gen Xers are the children of the Silent Generation and older baby boomers. Generation X are usually the parents of Generation Z, and sometimes millennials.

== Characteristics ==
=== In the United States ===
==== As children and adolescents ====
===== Rising divorce rates and women workforce participation =====
Strauss and Howe, who wrote several books on generations, including one specifically on Generation X titled 13th Gen: Abort, Retry, Ignore, Fail? (1993), reported that Gen Xers were children at a time when society was less focused on children and more focused on adults. Xers were children during a time of increasing divorce rates, which doubled in the mid-1960s before peaking in 1980. Strauss and Howe described a cultural shift where the long-held social value of staying together for the sake of the children was replaced by a value of parental and individual self-actualization. Strauss wrote that society "moved from what Leslie Fiedler called a 1950s-era 'cult of the child' to what Landon Jones called a 1970s-era 'cult of the adult'". The Generation Map, a report from Australia's McCrindle Research Center writes of Gen X children: Boomer parents were the most divorced generation in Australian history". According to Christine Henseler in the 2012 book Generation X Goes Global: Mapping a Youth Culture in Motion, "We watched the decay and demise (of the family), and grew callous to the loss."

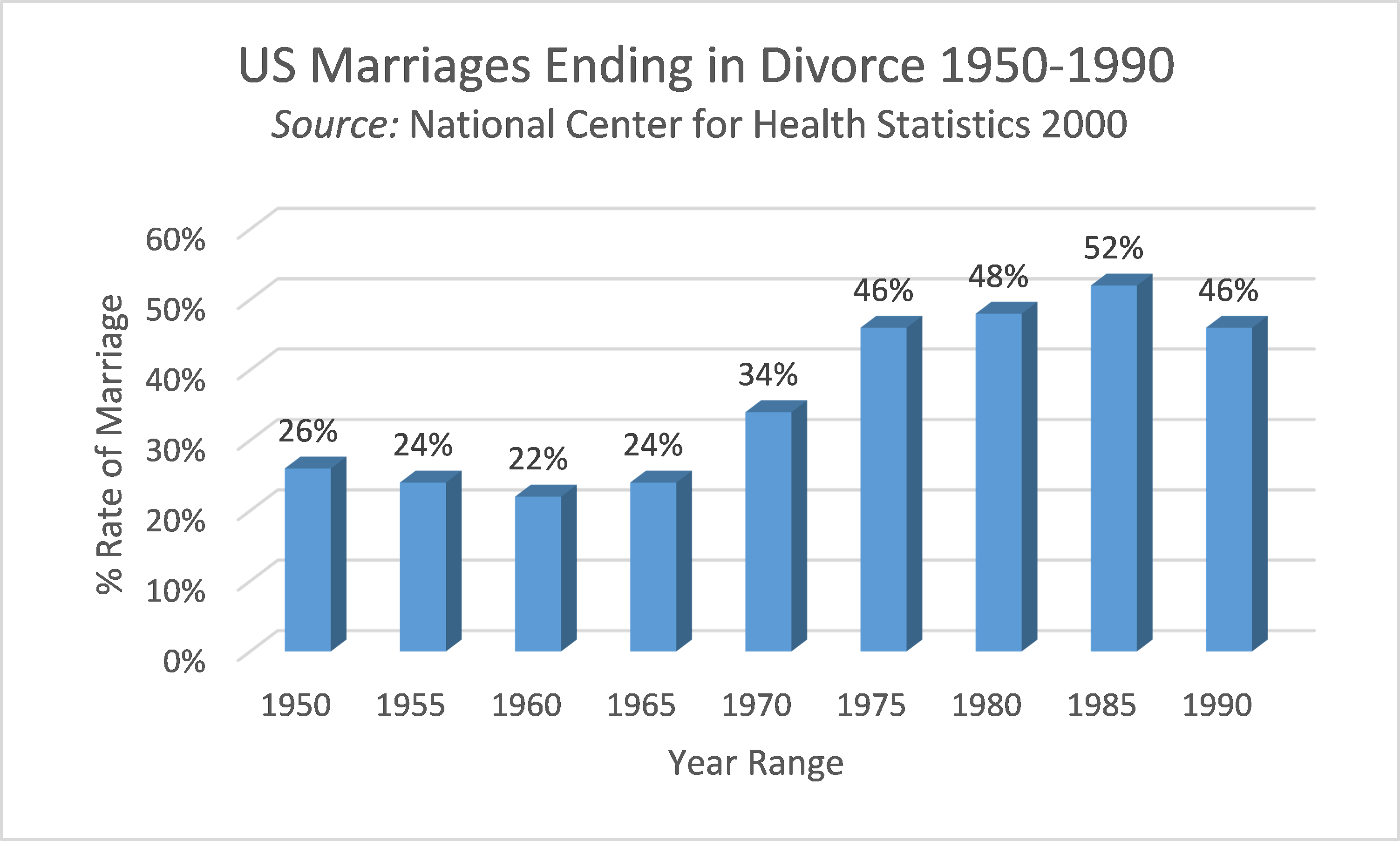
U.S. Marriages Ending in Divorce 1950–1990

The Gen X childhood coincided with the sexual revolution of the 1960s to 1980s, which Susan Gregory Thomas described in her book In Spite of Everything as confusing and frightening for children in cases where a parent would bring new sexual partners into their home. Thomas also discussed how divorce was different during the Gen X childhood, with the child having a limited or severed relationship with one parent after divorce, often the father, due to differing social and legal expectations. In the 1970s, only nine U.S. states allowed joint custody of children, which has been adopted by all 50 states after a push for joint custody during the mid-1980s. Kramer vs. Kramer, a 1979 American legal drama based on Avery Corman's best-selling novel, epitomized the struggle for child custody and the demise of the traditional nuclear family.

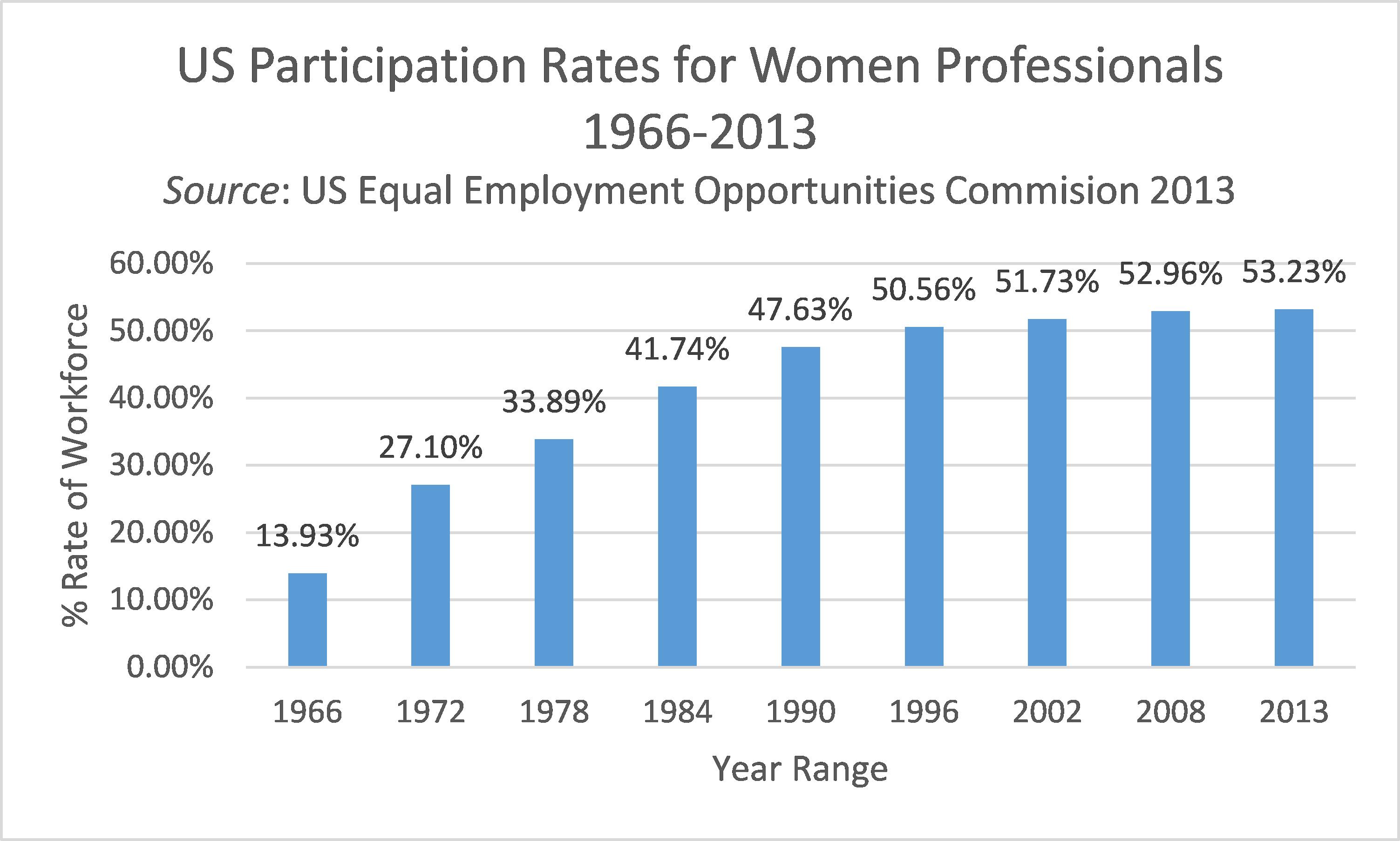
U.S. Participation Rates for Women Professionals 1966–2013

The rapid influx of Boomer women into the labor force that began in the 1970s was marked by the confidence of many in their ability to successfully pursue a career while meeting their children's needs. This resulted in an increase in latchkey children, leading to the term "latchkey generation" for Generation X. These children lacked adult supervision in the hours between the end of the school day and when a parent returned home from work in the evening, and for longer periods of time during the summer. Latchkey children became common among all socioeconomic demographics, but particularly among middle- and upper-class children. The higher the educational attainment of the parents, the higher the odds their children would be latchkey children, due to increased maternal participation in the workforce at a time before childcare options outside the home were widely available. McCrindle Research Centre described the cohort as "the first to grow up without a large adult presence, with both parents working", saying this made Gen Xers more peer-oriented than previous generations.

===== Conservative and neoliberal turn =====
Some older Gen Xers started high school in the waning years of the Carter presidency, but much of the cohort became socially and politically conscious during the Reagan Era. President Ronald Reagan, voted in office principally by the Boomer generation, embraced laissez-faire economics with vigor. His policies included cuts in the growth of government spending, reduction in taxes for the higher echelon of society, legalization of stock buybacks, and deregulation of key industries. The early 1980s recession saw unemployment rise to 10.8% in 1982; requiring, more often than not, dual parental incomes. One in five American children grew up in poverty during this time. The federal debt almost tripled during Reagan's time in office, from $998 billion in 1981 to $2.857 trillion in 1989, placing greater burden of repayment on the incoming generation.

Government expenditure shifted from domestic programs to defense. Remaining funding initiatives, moreover, tended to be diverted away from programs for children and often directed toward the elderly population, with cuts to Medicaid and programs for children and young families, and protection and expansion of Medicare and Social Security for the elderly population. These programs for the elderly were not tied to economic need. Congressman David Durenberger criticized this political situation, saying that while programs for poor children and young families were cut, the government provided "free health care to elderly millionaires".

===== Crack epidemic and AIDS =====
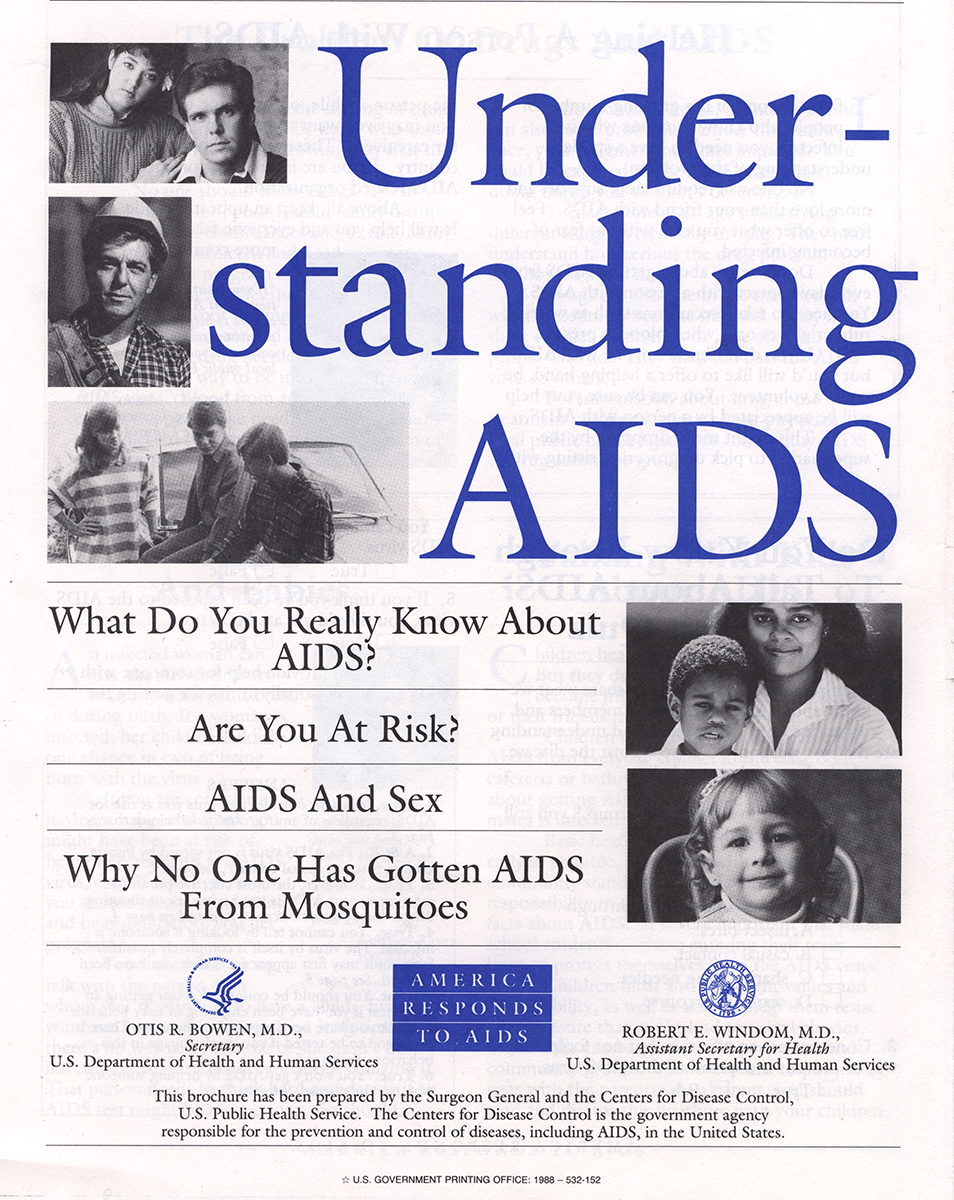
U.S. Department of Health booklet published in 1988

Gen Xers came of age or were children during the 1980s crack epidemic, which disproportionately impacted urban areas as well as the African-American community in the U.S. Drug turf battles increased violent crime, and crack cocaine addiction affected communities and families. Between 1984 and 1989, the homicide rate for black males aged 14 to 17 doubled in the U.S., and the homicide rate for black males aged 18 to 24 increased almost as much. The crack epidemic destabilized families, with an increase in the number of children in foster care. In 1986, President Reagan signed the Anti-Drug Abuse Act to enforce strict mandatory minimum sentencing for drug users. He also increased the federal budget for supply-reduction efforts.

The AIDS epidemic of the 1980s and 1990s loomed over the adolescence and young adulthood of Generation X. The disease was first clinically observed in the U.S. in 1981; by 1985, an estimated one-to-two million Americans were HIV-positive. This particularly hit the LGBT community. As the virus spread, at a time before effective treatments were available, a public panic ensued. Sex education programs in schools were adapted to address the AIDS epidemic, which taught Gen X students that sex could kill them.

===== Rise of home computing =====
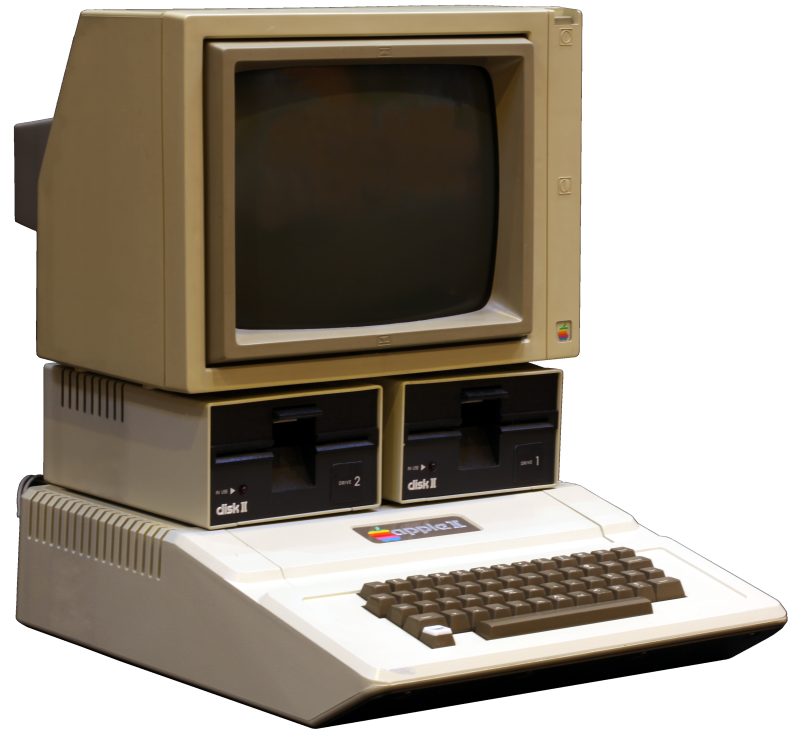
An 8-bit 1977 Apple II

Gen Xers were the first children to have access to personal computers in their homes and at schools. In the early 1980s, the growth in the use of personal computers exploded. Manufacturers such as Commodore, Atari, and Apple responded to the demand via 8-bit and 16-bit machines. This in turn stimulated the software industries with corresponding developments for backup storage, use of the floppy disk, zip drive, and CD-ROM.

At school, several computer projects were supported by the Department of Education under United States Secretary of Education Terrel Bell's "Technology Initiative". This was later mirrored in the UK's 1982 Computers for Schools programme and, in France, under the 1985 scheme Plan Informatique pour Tous (IPT).

===== Post–civil rights generation =====
In the U.S., Generation X was the first cohort to grow up post-integration after the racist Jim Crow laws. They were described in a marketing report by Specialty Retail as the kids who "lived the civil rights movement". They were among the first children to be bused to attain integration in the public school system. In the 1990s, Strauss reported Gen Xers were "by any measure the least racist of today's generations". In the U.S., Title IX, which passed in 1972, provided increased athletic opportunities to Gen X girls in the public school setting. Roots, based on the novel by Alex Haley and broadcast as a 12-hour series, was viewed as a turning point in the country's ability to relate to Afro-American history.

==== As young adults ====
===== Continued growth in college enrollments =====
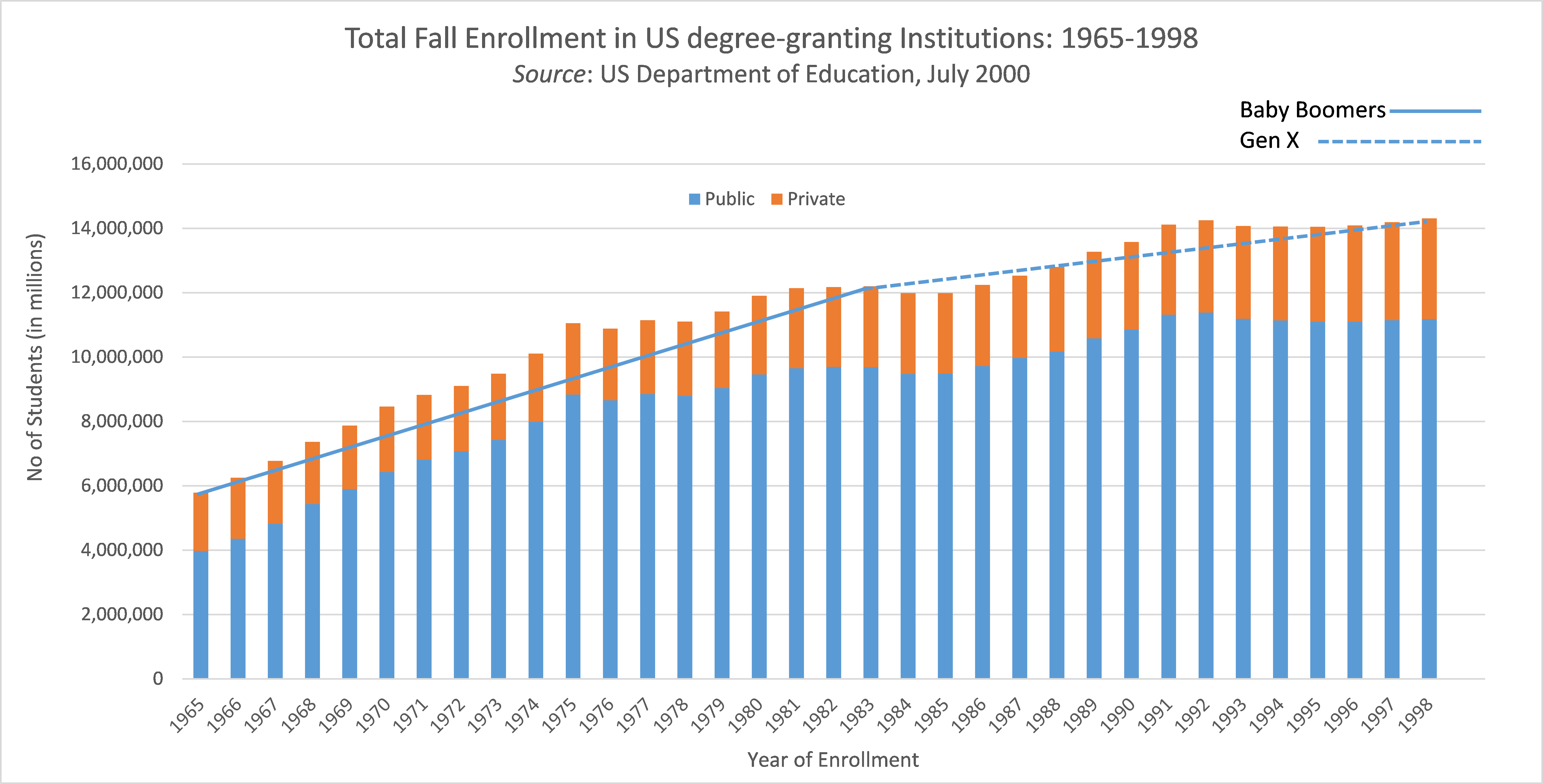
Total Fall Enrollment in U.S. degree granting Institutions 1965–1998

In the U.S., compared to the Boomer generation, Generation X was more educated than their parents. The share of young adults enrolling in college steadily increased from 1983, before peaking in 1998. In 1965, as early Boomers entered college, total enrollment of new undergraduates was just over 5.7 million across the public and private sectors. By 1983, the first year of Gen X college enrollments (per Pew Research's definition), this figure had reached 12.2 million. This was an increase of 53%, effectively a doubling in student intake. As the 1990s progressed, Gen X college enrollments continued to climb, with increased loan borrowing as the cost of an education became substantially more expensive compared to their peers in the mid-1980s. By 1998, the generation's last year of college enrollment, those entering the higher education sector totaled 14.3 million. In addition, unlike Boomers and previous generations, women outpaced men in college completion rates.

===== Adjusting to a new societal environment =====
For early Gen Xer graduates entering the job market at the end of the 1980s, economic conditions were challenging and did not show signs of major improvements until the mid-1990s. In the U.S., restrictive monetary policy to curb rising inflation and the collapse of a large number of savings and loan associations (private banks that specialized in home mortgages) impacted the welfare of many American households. This precipitated a large government bailout, which placed further strain on the budget. Furthermore, three decades of growth came to an end. The social contract between employers and employees, which had endured during the 1960s and 1970s and was scheduled to last until retirement, was no longer applicable. By the late 1980s, there were large-scale layoffs of Boomers, corporate downsizing, and accelerated offshoring of production.

On the political front, in the U.S. the generation became ambivalent if not outright disaffected with politics. They had been reared in the shadow of the Vietnam War and the Watergate scandal. They came to maturity under the Reagan and George H. W. Bush presidencies, with first-hand experience of the impact of neoliberal policies. Few had experienced a Democratic administration and even then, only, at an atmospheric level. For those on the left of the political spectrum, the disappointments with the previous Boomer student mobilizations of the 1960s and the collapse of those movements towards a consumerist "greed is good" and "yuppie" culture during the 1980s felt, to a great extent, like hypocrisy if not outright betrayal. Hence, the preoccupation on "authenticity" and not "selling-out". The Revolutions of 1989 and the collapse of the socialist utopia with the fall of the Berlin Wall, moreover, added to the disillusionment that any alternative to the capitalist model was possible.

===== Birth of the "slacker" =====
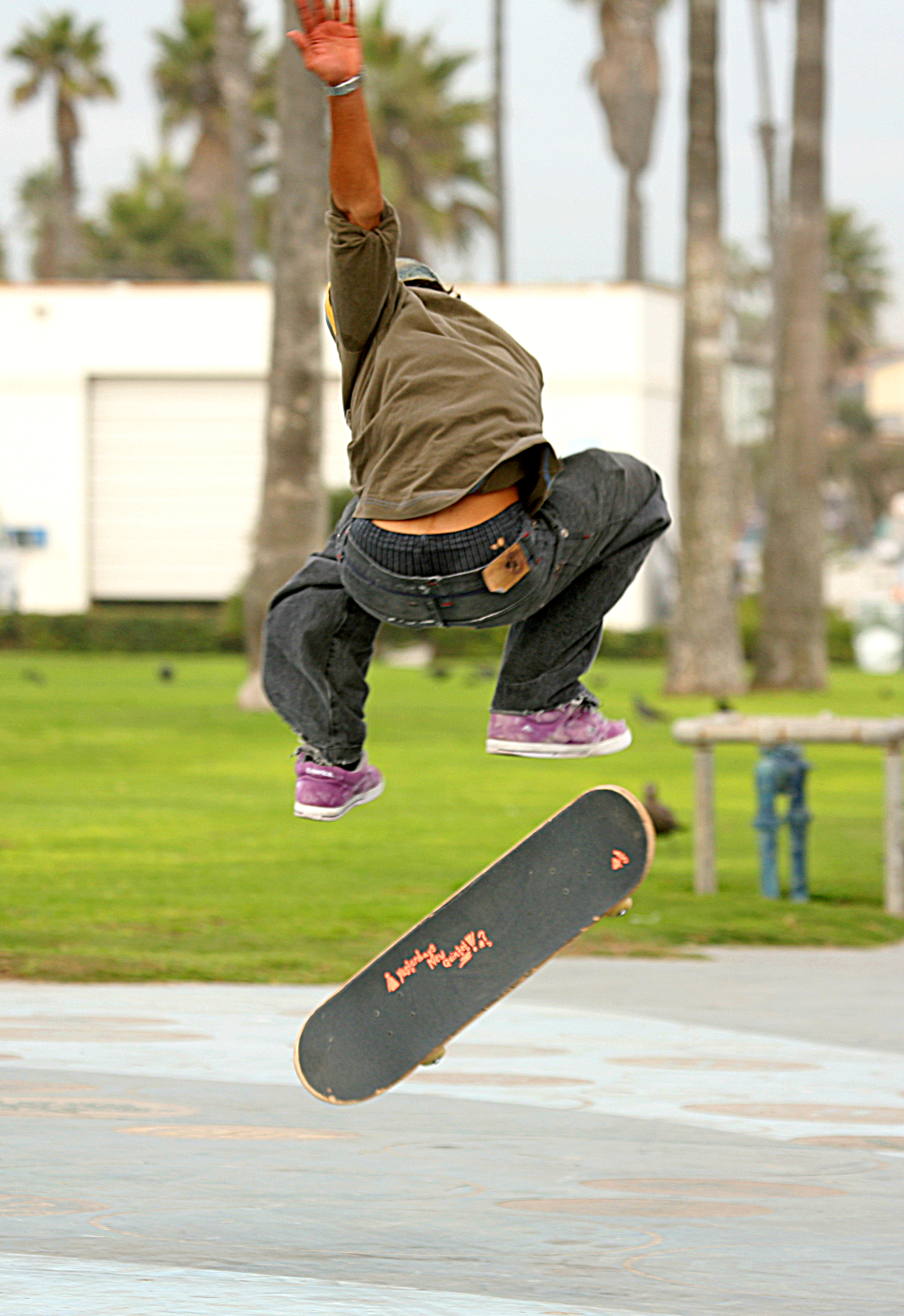
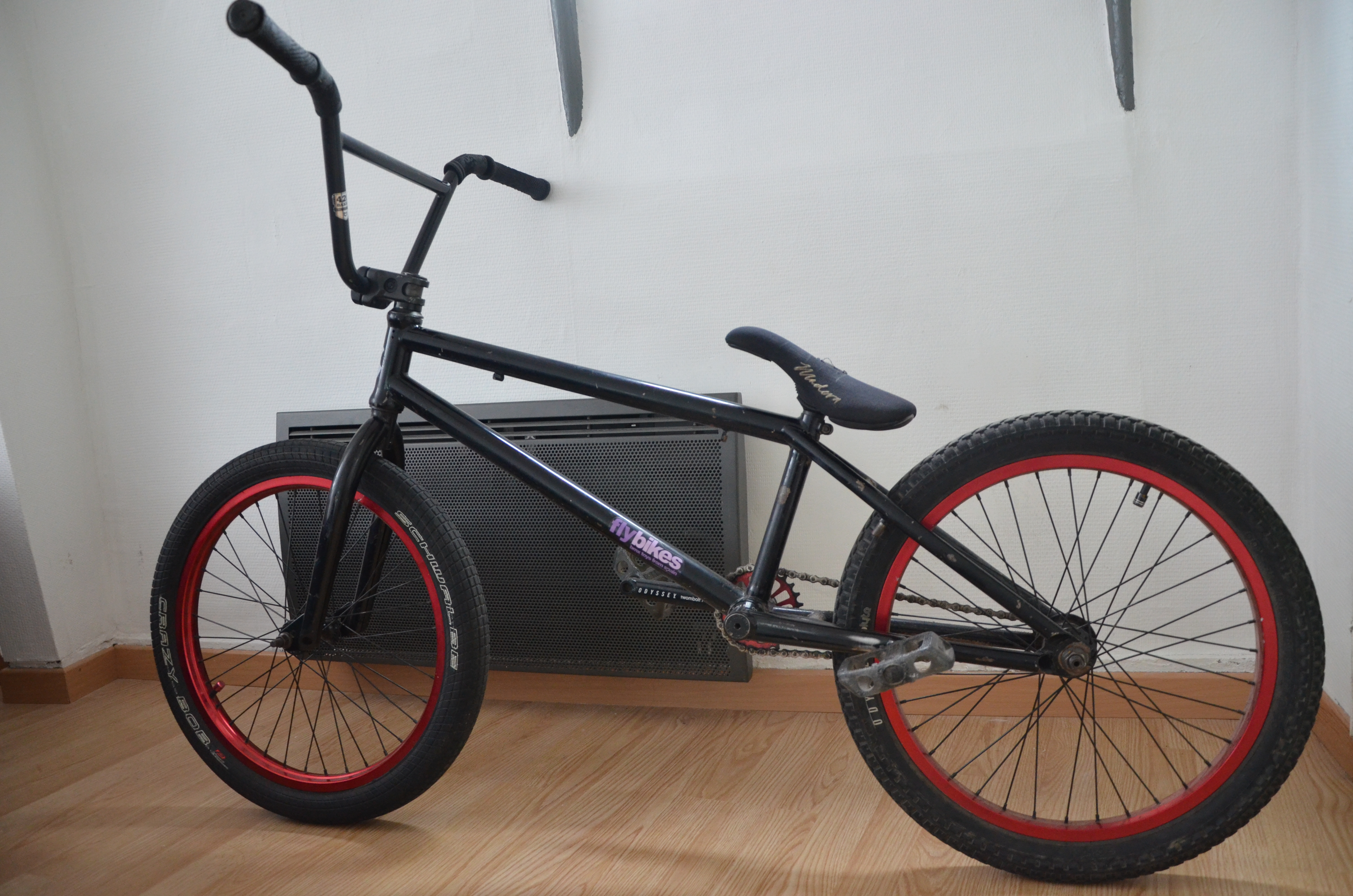
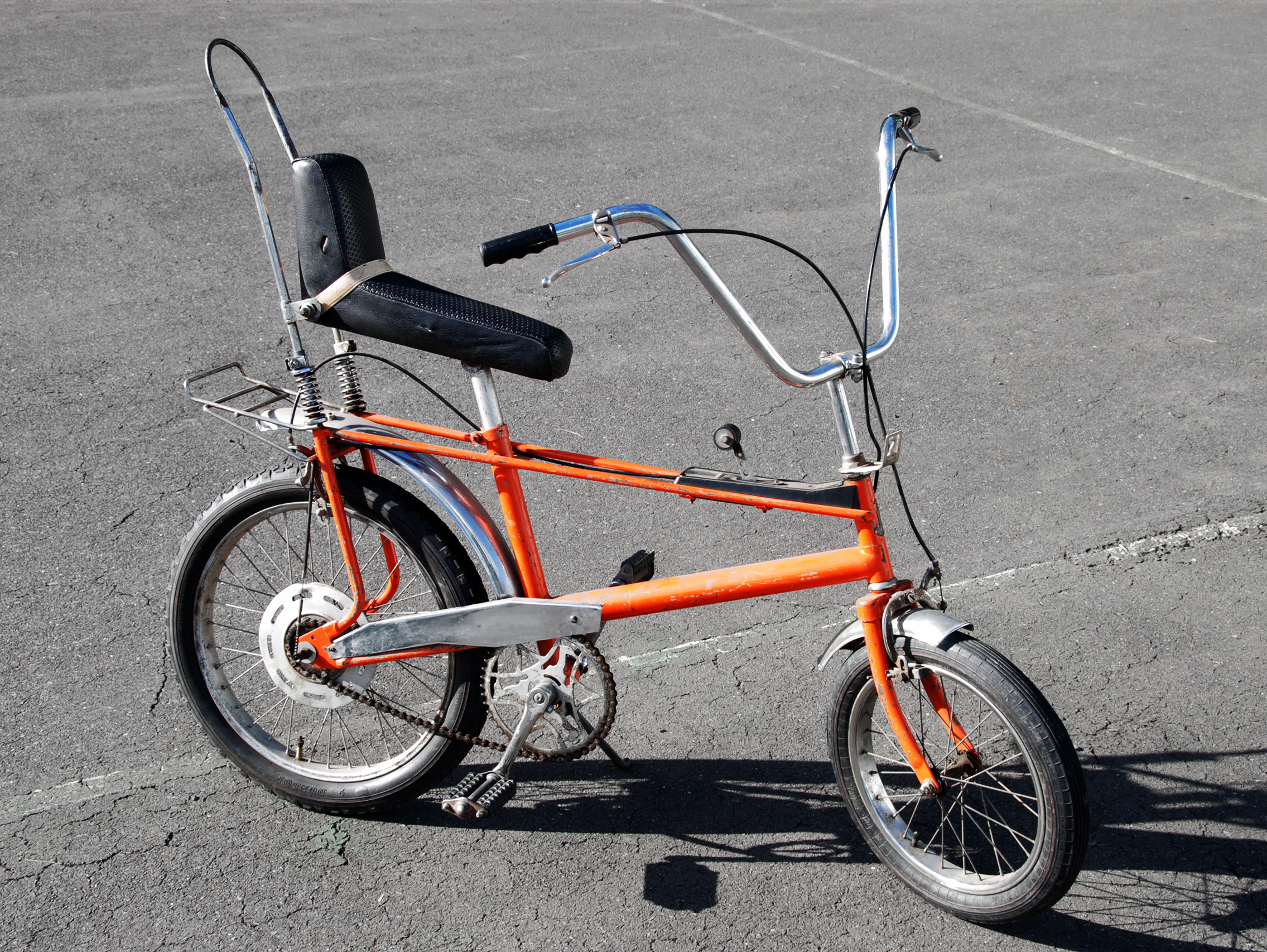
Skateboarding, BMX bikes, and chopper bikes were popular among Generation X adolescents in the 1980s and 1990s.

In 1990, Time magazine published an article titled "Living: Proceeding with Caution", which described those then in their 20s as aimless and unfocused. Media pundits and advertisers further struggled to define the cohort, typically portraying them as "unfocused twentysomethings". A MetLife report noted: "media would portray them as the Friends generation: rather self-involved and perhaps aimless...but fun".

Gen Xers were often portrayed as apathetic or as "slackers", lacking bearings, a stereotype which was initially tied to Richard Linklater's comedic and essentially plotless 1991 film Slacker. After the film was released, "journalists and critics thought they put a finger on what was different about these young adults in that 'they were reluctant to grow up' and 'disdainful of earnest action'". Ben Stiller's 1994 film Reality Bites also sought to capture the zeitgeist of the generation with a portrayal of the attitudes and lifestyle choices of the time.

Negative stereotypes of Gen X young adults continued, including that they were "bleak, cynical, and disaffected". In 1998, such stereotypes prompted sociological research at Stanford University to study the accuracy of the characterization of Gen X young adults as cynical and disaffected. Using the national General Social Survey, the researchers compared answers to identical survey questions asked of 18–29-year-olds in three different time periods. Additionally, they compared how older adults answered the same survey questions over time. The surveys showed 18–29-year-old Gen Xers did exhibit higher levels of cynicism and disaffection than previous cohorts of 18–29-year-olds surveyed. However, they also found that cynicism and disaffection had increased among all age groups surveyed over time, not just young adults, making this a period effect, not a cohort effect. In other words, adults of all ages were more cynical and disaffected in the 1990s, not just Generation X.

In a 2023 interview with television host Bill Maher on the podcast Club Random with Bill Maher, vocalist and guitarist Billy Corgan hinted at how the Smashing Pumpkins spoke to the disillusionment felt by many Gen Xers as they reached adulthood, noting:

At least generationally, I think that's why I connected with so many people—because I was speaking the patois of: Gilligan's Island meets "What the fuck happened in my life?"

==== Rise of the Internet and the dot-com bubble ====
By the mid-late 1990s, under Bill Clinton's presidency, economic optimism had returned to the U.S., with unemployment reduced from 7.5% in 1992 to 4% in 2000. Younger members of Gen X, straddling across administrations, politically experienced a "liberal renewal". In 1997, Time magazine published an article titled "Generation X Reconsidered", which retracted the previously reported negative stereotypes and reported positive accomplishments. The article cited Gen Xers' tendency to found technology startup companies and small businesses, as well as their ambition, which research showed was higher among Gen X young adults than older generations. Yet, the slacker moniker stuck. As the decade progressed, Gen X gained a reputation for entrepreneurship. In 1999, The New York Times dubbed them "Generation 1099", describing them as the "once pitied but now envied group of self-employed workers whose income is reported to the Internal Revenue Service not on a W-2 form, but on Form 1099".

In the late 1990s, many Gen X entrepreneurs and programmers attempted to capitalize on the dot-com bubble.

Consumer access to the Internet and its commercial development throughout the 1990s witnessed a frenzy of IT initiatives. Newly created companies, launched on stock exchanges globally, were formed with dubitable revenue generation or cash flow. When the dot-com bubble eventually burst in 2000, older Gen Xers who had embarked as entrepreneurs in the IT industry while riding the Internet wave, as well as younger Gen Xers who were newly qualified programmers (having used AOL and the first web browsers in high school or college), were both caught in the crash. This had major repercussions, with cross-generational consequences; five years after the bubble burst, new matriculation of IT Millennial undergraduates fell by 40% and by as much as 70% in some information systems programs.

However, following the crisis, sociologist Mike Males reported continued confidence and optimism among the cohort. He reported "surveys consistently find 80% to 90% of Gen Xers self-confident and optimistic". Males wrote "these young Americans should finally get the recognition they deserve", praising the cohort and stating that "the permissively raised, universally deplored Generation X is the true 'great generation', for it has braved a hostile social climate to reverse abysmal trends". He described them as the hardest-working group since the World War II generation. He reported Gen Xers' entrepreneurial tendencies helped create the high-tech industry that fueled the 1990s economic recovery. In 2002, Time magazine published an article titled Gen Xers Aren't Slackers After All, reporting that four out of five new businesses were the work of Gen Xers.

===== Response to 9/11 =====
In the U.S., Gen Xers were described as the major heroes of the September 11 terrorist attacks by author William Strauss. The firefighters and police responding to the attacks were predominantly from Generation X. Additionally, the leaders of the passenger revolt on United Airlines Flight 93 were also, by majority, Gen Xers. Author Neil Howe reported survey data which showed that Gen Xers were cohabiting and getting married in increasing numbers following the terrorist attacks. Gen X survey respondents reported that they no longer wanted to live alone.

In October 2001, the Seattle Post-Intelligencer wrote of Gen Xers: "Now they could be facing the most formative events of their lives and their generation." The Greensboro News & Record reported members of the cohort "felt a surge of patriotism since terrorists struck" by giving blood, working for charities, donating to charities, and by joining the military to fight the war on terror. The Jury Expert, a publication of The American Society of Trial Consultants, reported: "Gen X members responded to the terrorist attacks with bursts of patriotism and national fervor that surprised even themselves."

==== In midlife ====
===== Achieving a work-life balance =====
Though baby boomers have accumulated more wealth than later generations, millennials and Generation X are accumulating wealth at comparable rates to baby boomers.

In 2011, survey analysis from the Longitudinal Study of American Youth found Gen Xers (defined as those who were then between the ages of 30 and 50) to be "balanced, active, and happy" in midlife and as achieving a work-life balance. The Longitudinal Study of Youth is an NIH-NIA funded study by the University of Michigan which has been studying Generation X since 1987. The study asked questions such as "Thinking about all aspects of your life, how happy are you? If zero means that you are very unhappy and 10 means that you are very happy, please rate your happiness." LSA reported that "mean level of happiness was 7.5 and the median (middle score) was 8. Only four percent of Generation X adults indicated a great deal of unhappiness (a score of three or lower). Twenty-nine percent of Generation X adults were very happy with a score of 9 or 10 on the scale."

In 2014, Pew Research provided further insight, describing the cohort as "savvy, skeptical and self-reliant; they're not into preening or pampering, and they just might not give much of a hoot what others think of them. Or whether others think of them at all." Furthermore, guides regarding managing multiple generations in the workforce describe Gen Xers as: independent, resilient, resourceful, self-managing, adaptable, cynical, pragmatic, skeptical of authority, and as seeking a work-life balance.

===== Entrepreneurship as an individual trait =====
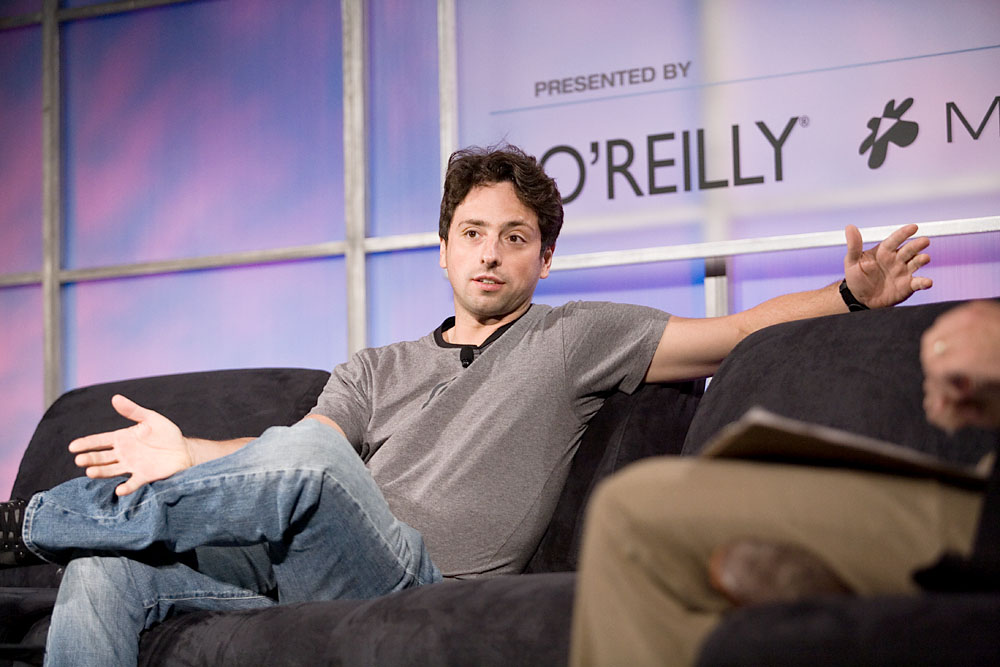
Google co-founder Sergey Brin, speaking at a Web 2.0 conference

Individualism is one of the defining traits of Generation X, and is reflected in their entrepreneurial spirit. In the 2008 book X Saves the World: How Generation X Got the Shaft but Can Still Keep Everything from Sucking, author Jeff Gordinier describes Generation X as a "dark horse demographic" which "doesn't seek the limelight". Gordinier cites examples of Gen Xers' contributions to society such as: Google, Wikipedia, Amazon.com, and YouTube, arguing that if Boomers had created them, "we'd never hear the end of it". In the book, Gordinier contrasts Gen Xers to baby boomers, saying Boomers tend to trumpet their accomplishments more than Gen Xers do, creating what he describes as "elaborate mythologies" around their achievements. Gordinier cites Steve Jobs as an example, while Gen Xers, he argues, are more likely to "just quietly do their thing".

In a 2007 article published in the Harvard Business Review, authors Strauss and Howe wrote of Generation X: "They are already the greatest entrepreneurial generation in U.S. history; their high-tech savvy and marketplace resilience have helped America prosper in the era of globalization." According to authors Michael Hais and Morley Winograd:

Small businesses and the entrepreneurial spirit that Gen Xers embody have become one of the most popular institutions in America. There's been a recent shift in consumer behavior and Gen Xers will join the "idealist generation" in encouraging the celebration of individual effort and business risk-taking. As a result, Xers will spark a renaissance of entrepreneurship in economic life, even as overall confidence in economic institutions declines. Customers, and their needs and wants (including millennials) will become the North Star for an entire new generation of entrepreneurs.

A 2015 study by Sage Group reported that Gen Xers "dominate the playing field" with respect to founding startups in the US and Canada, launching the majority (55%) of all new businesses in 2015.

===== Income benefits of a college education =====
Generation X was the last generation in the U.S. for whom higher education was broadly financially remunerative. In 2019, the Federal Reserve Bank of St. Louis published research (using data from the 2016 Survey of Consumer Finances) demonstrating that after controlling for race and age, families with heads of household born before 1980 had higher wealth and income when the head of household had post-secondary education. For those born after 1980, the wealth premium (of college education) was no longer statistically significant (in part because of the rising cost of college). The income premium, while remaining positive, had declined to historic lows, with more pronounced downward trajectories among heads of household with postgraduate degrees.

===== Parenting and volunteering =====
In terms of advocating for their children in the educational setting, author Neil Howe describes Gen X parents as distinct from baby boomer parents. Howe argues that Gen Xers are not helicopter parents, which Howe describes as a parenting style of Boomer parents of millennials. Howe described Gen Xers instead as "stealth fighter parents", due to the tendency of Gen X parents to let minor issues go and to not hover over their children in the educational setting, but to intervene forcefully and swiftly in the event of more serious issues. In 2012, the Corporation for National and Community Service ranked Gen X volunteer rates in the U.S. at "29.4% per year", the highest compared with other generations. The rankings were based on a three-year moving average between 2009 and 2011.

===== Communication style =====
Generation X prefers the communication modes of face-to-face and phone, whereas the younger generations prefer e-mail and texting. Generation X is more likely than Generation Z to know cursive and more likely than millennials to use postal mail. Also, Generation X is less likely to ghost than millennials and Generation Z. Social media usage is also different, with Generation X preferring LinkedIn and Facebook while millennials and Generation Z prefer Snapchat and TikTok.

===== Income differential with previous generations =====
A report titled Economic Mobility: Is the American Dream Alive and Well? focused on the income of men 30–39 in 2004 (those born between April 1964 and March 1974). The study was released on 25 May 2007 and emphasized that this generation's men made less (by 12%) than their fathers had at the same age in 1974, thus reversing a historical trend. It concluded that annual increases in household income generated by fathers/sons slowed from an average of 0.9% to 0.3%, barely keeping pace with inflation. "Family incomes have risen, though (over the period 1947 to 2005), because more women have gone to work", "supporting the incomes of men, by adding a second earner to the family. And as with male income, the trend is downward."

=== Globally ===
Although, globally, children and adolescents of Generation X will have been heavily influenced by U.S. cultural industries with shared global currents (e.g., rising divorce rates, the AIDS epidemic, advancements in ICT), there is not one U.S.-born-and-raised concept but multiple perspectives and geographical outgrowths. Even within the period of analysis, inside national communities, commonalities will have differed on the basis of one's birth date. The generation, Christine Henseler also remarks, was shaped as much by real-world events, within national borders, determined by specific political, cultural, and historical incidents. She adds "In other words, it is in between both real, clearly bordered spaces and more fluid global currents that we can spot the spirit of Generation X."

In 2016, a global consumer insights project from Viacom International Media Networks and Viacom, based on over 12,000 respondents across 21 countries, reported on Gen X's unconventional approach to sex, friendship, and family, their desire for flexibility and fulfillment at work and the absence of midlife crisis for Gen Xers. The project also included a 20-minute documentary titled Gen X Today.

==== Russia ====
In Russia, Generation Xers are referred to as "the last Soviet children", as the last children to come of age prior to the downfall of communism in their nation and prior to the Dissolution of the Soviet Union. Those that reached adulthood in the 1980s and grew up educated in the doctrines of Marxism and Leninism found themselves against a background of economic and social change, with the advent of Mikhail Gorbachev to power and Perestroika. However, even before the collapse of the Soviet Union and the disbanding of the Communist Party of the Soviet Union, surveys demonstrated that Russian young people repudiated the key features of the Communist worldview that their party leaders, schoolteachers, and even parents had tried to instill in them. This generation, caught in the transition between Marxism–Leninism and an unknown future, and wooed by the new domestic political classes, remained largely apathetic.

==== France ====
In France, "Generation X" is not as widely known or used to define its members. Politically, this loosely denotes those born in the early 1960s to the early 1980s. Although fertility rates started to fall in 1965, number of births in France only followed suit in 1975. There is general agreement that, domestically, the event that is accepted in France as the separating point between the baby boomer generation and Generation X are the French strikes and violent riots of May 1968 with those of the generation too young to participate. Those at the start of the cohort are sometimes referred to as 'Génération Bof' because of their tendency to use the word 'bof', which, translated into English, means "whatever".

The generation is closely associated with socialist François Mitterrand who served as President of France during two consecutive terms between 1981 and 1995 as most transitioned from teenagers into adulthood during that period. Economically, Xers started when the new labour market was emerging and were the first to fully experience the advent of the post-industrial society. For those at the tail-end of the generation, educational and defence reforms, a new style baccalauréat général with three distinct streams in 1995 (the preceding programme, introduced in 1968) the 2002 licence-master-doctorat reform for first Millennial graduates (DEUG, Maîtrise, DESS and DEA degrees no longer awarded), and the cessation of military conscription in 1997 (for those born after January 1979) are considered as new transition points to the next.

==== Republic of Ireland ====
In Ireland, "Generation X" came of age during The Troubles, the 1980s economic recession, and the Celtic Tiger prosperity of the 1990s onward. The appropriateness of the term to Ireland has been questioned, with Darach Ó Séaghdha noting that "Generation X is usually contrasted with the one before by growing up in smaller and different family units on account of their parents having greater access to contraception and divorce – again, things that were not widely available in Ireland. [Contraception was only available under prescription in 1978 and without prescription in 1985; divorce was illegal until 1996.] However, this generation was in prime position to benefit from the Celtic Tiger, the Peace Process and liberalisations introduced on foot of EU membership and was less likely to emigrate than those that came before and after. You could say that in many ways, these are Ireland's real Boomers."

Culturally, Britpop, Celtic rock, the trad revival, Father Ted, the 1990 FIFA World Cup and rave culture were significant. The Divine Comedy song "Generation Sex" (1998) painted a picture of hedonism in the late 20th century, as well as its effect on the media. David McWilliams' 2005 book The Pope's Children: Ireland's New Elite profiled Irish people born in the 1970s (just prior to the papal visit to Ireland), which was a baby boom that saw Ireland's population increase for the first time since the 1840s Great Famine. The Pope's Children were in position to benefit from the Celtic Tiger and the newly liberal culture, where the Catholic Church had significantly less social power.

==== United Kingdom ====
===== As children, adolescents and young adults =====
====== Political environment ======
The United Kingdom's Economic and Social Research Council described Generation X as "Thatcher's children" because the cohort grew up while Margaret Thatcher was Prime Minister from 1979 to 1990, "a time of social flux and transformation". Those born in the late 1960s and early 1970s grew up in a period of social unrest. While unemployment was low in the early 1970s, industrial and social unrest escalated. Strike action culminated in the "Winter of Discontent" in 1978–79, and the Troubles began to unfold in Northern Ireland. The turn to neoliberal policies introduced and maintained by consecutive conservative governments from 1979 to 1997 marked the end of the post-war consensus.

====== Education ======
The almost universal dismantling of the grammar school system in Great Britain during the 1960s and the 1970s meant that the vast majority of the cohort attended comprehensive schools. Compulsory education ended at the age of 16. As older members of the cohort reached the end of their mandatory schooling, levels of educational enrollment among older adolescents remained below much of the Western world. By the early 1980s, some 80% to 90% of school leavers in France and West Germany received vocational training, compared with 40% in the United Kingdom. By the mid-1980s, over 80% of pupils in the United States and West Germany and over 90% in Japan stayed in education until the age of eighteen, compared with 33% of British pupils. There was, however, broadly a rise in education levels among this age range as Generation X passed through it.

In 1990, 25% of young people in England stayed in some kind of full-time education after the age of 18, this was an increase from 15% a decade earlier. Later, the Further and Higher Education Act 1992 and the liberalization of higher education in the UK saw greater numbers of those born towards the tail-end of the generation gaining university places.

====== Employment ======
The 1980s, when some of Generation X reached working age, was an era defined by high unemployment rates. This was particularly true of the youngest members of the working aged population. In 1984, 26% of 16 to 24 year olds were neither in full-time education or participating in the workforce. However, this figure did decrease as the economic situation improved reaching 17% by 1993.

===== In midlife =====
Generation X were far more likely to have children out of wedlock than their parents. The number of babies being born to unmarried parents in England and Wales rose from 11% in 1979, a quarter in 1998, 40% by 2002 and almost half in 2012. They were also significantly more likely to have children later in life than their predecessors. The average age of a mother giving birth rose from 27 in 1982 to 30 in 2012. That year saw 29,994 children born to mothers over the age 40, an increase of 360% from 2002.

A 2016 study of over 2,500 British office workers conducted by Workfront found that survey respondents of all ages selected those from Generation X as the hardest-working employees and members of the workforce (chosen by 60%). Gen X was also ranked highest among fellow workers for having the strongest work ethic (chosen by 59.5%), being the most helpful (55.4%), the most skilled (54.5%), and the best troubleshooters/problem-solvers (41.6%).

===== Political evolution =====
Ipsos MORI reports that at the 1987 and 1992 general elections, the first United Kingdom general elections where significant numbers of Generation X members could vote, a plurality of 18 to 24 year olds opted for the Labour Party by a small margin. The polling organization's figures suggest that in 1987, 39% of that age group voted Labour, 37% for the Conservatives and 22% for the SDP–Liberal Alliance. Five years later, these numbers were fairly similar at 38% Labour, 35% Conservative and 19% Liberal Democrats, a party by then formed from the previously mentioned alliance. Both these elections saw a fairly significant lead for the Conservatives in the popular vote among the general population.

At the 1997 General election where Labour won a large majority of seats and a comfortable lead in the popular vote, research suggests that voters under the age of 35 were more likely to vote Labour if they turned out than the wider electorate but significantly less likely to vote than in 1992. Analysts suggested this may have been due to fewer differences in policies between the major parties and young people having less of a sense of affiliation with particular political parties than older generations. A similar trend continued at the 2001 and 2005 general elections as turnout dropped further among both the relatively young and the wider public.

Voter turnout across the electorate began to recover from a 2001 low until the 2017 general election. Generation X also became more likely to vote as they entered the midlife age demographics. Polling suggests a plurality of their age group backed the Conservatives in 2010 and 2015 but less overwhelming than much of the older generation. At the 2016 EU membership referendum and 2017 general election, Generation X was split with younger members appearing to back remain and Labour and older members tending towards Leave and Conservative in a British electorate more polarized by age than ever before. At the 2019 general election, voting trends continued to be heavily divided by age but a plurality of younger as well as older generation X members (then 39 to 55 year olds) voted Conservative.

==== Germany ====
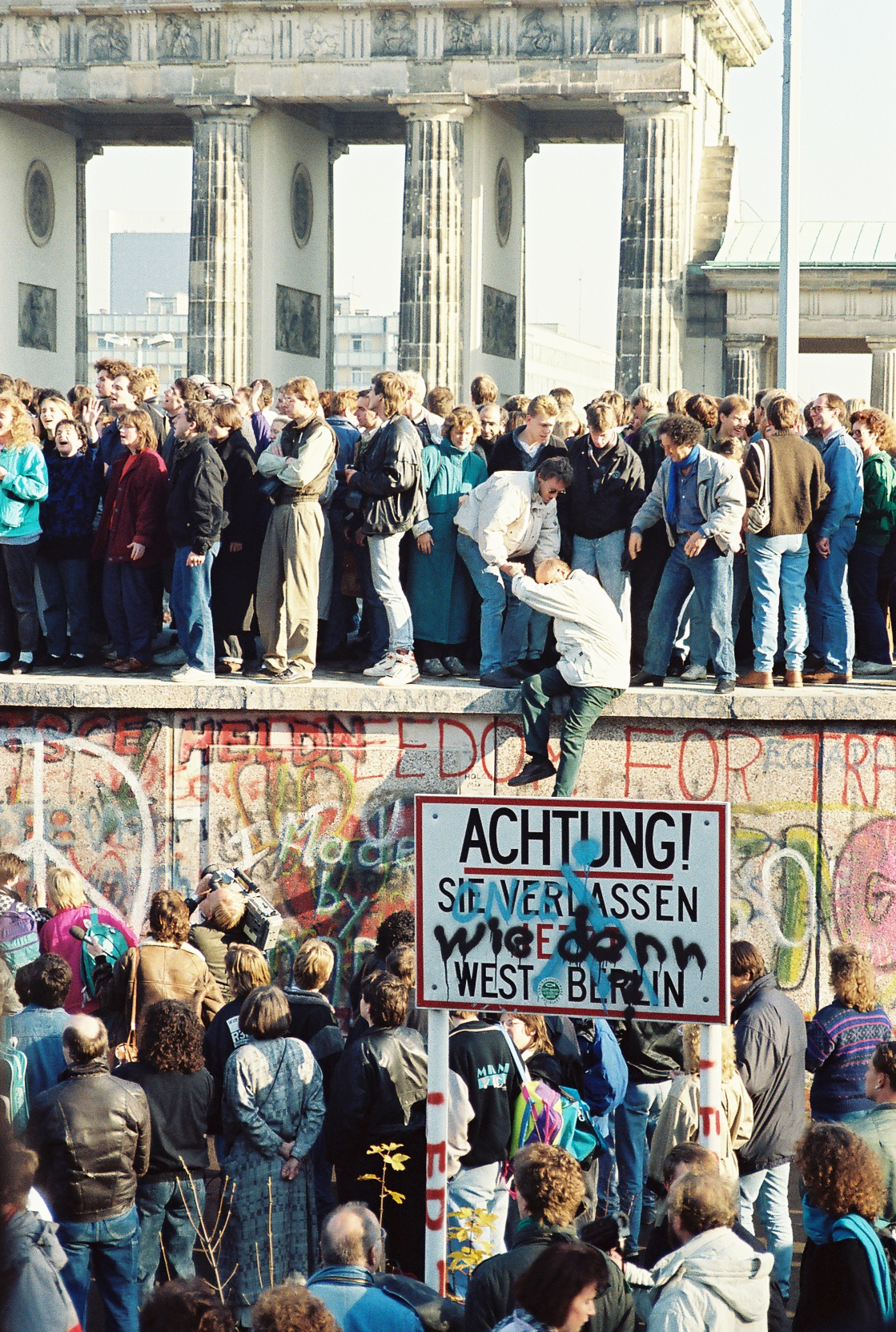
The fall of the Berlin Wall in 1989 was a landmark event in Generation X's formative years.

In Germany, "Generation X" is not widely used or applied. Instead, reference is sometimes made to "Generation Golf" in the previous West German republic, based on a novel by Florian Illies named for the Volkswagen Golf. In the east, children of the "Mauerfall" or coming down of the wall. For former East Germans, there was adaptation, but also a sense of loss of accustomed values and structures. These effects turned into romantic narratives of their childhood. For those in the West, there was a period of discovery and exploration of what had been a forbidden land.

==== South Africa ====
In South Africa, Gen Xers spent their formative years of the 1980s during the "hyper-politicized environment of the final years of apartheid".

== Arts and culture ==
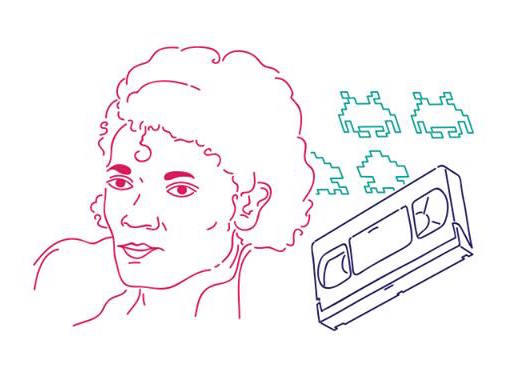
This illustration shows three cultural touchstones for Generation X: singer Michael Jackson, who dominated pop charts in the 1980s; alien characters from the popular arcade video game Space Invaders; and a videocassette, which revolutionized home entertainment by enabling TV viewers to record shows and watch prerecorded films at home.

=== Music ===
Gen Xers were the first cohort to come of age with MTV. They were the first generation to experience the emergence of music videos as teenagers and are sometimes called the MTV Generation. Gen Xers were responsible for the alternative rock movement of the 1980s and 1990s, including the grunge subgenre.

==== Punk rock ====
In the mid-to-late 1970s, a new generation of rock bands arose, including the Ramones, Johnny Thunders and the Heartbreakers, and the Dictators in New York City; the Sex Pistols, the Clash, the Damned, and Buzzcocks in the United Kingdom; and the Saints in Australia. These acts were recognized as the vanguard of punk rock, which spawned its own subculture that became more pervasive worldwide. The genre generally took root in local scenes that rejected affiliation with the mainstream. Many of the first punk musicians and fans were not Gen Xers but younger boomers or Generation Jones.

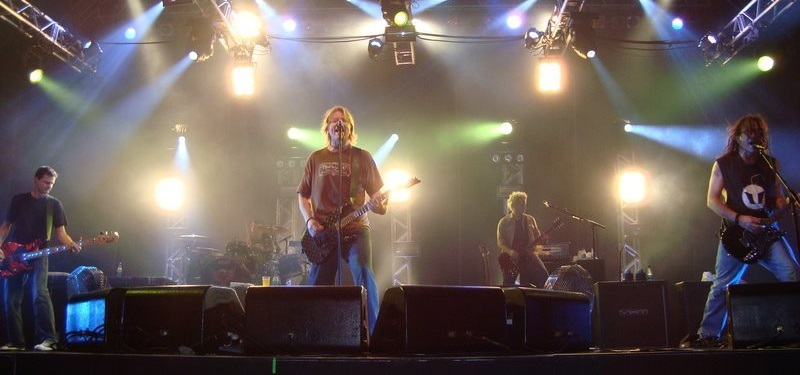
The Offspring performing in 2008 in Fortaleza, Brazil

As more Gen Xers entered adolescence and young adulthood in the 1980s, both the musicians and fanbase for punk became increasingly Gen X, and it therefore made a significant imprint on the cohort. By the 1980s, faster and more aggressive subgenres such as hardcore punk (e.g., Minor Threat, Bad Religion), street punk (e.g., the Exploited, NOFX) and anarcho-punk (e.g., Subhumans) became the predominant modes of punk rock. Musicians identifying with or inspired by punk often later pursued other musical directions, resulting in a broad range of spinoffs. This development gave rise to genres such as post-punk, new wave, and later indie pop, alternative rock, and noise rock. By the 1990s, punk rock reemerged into the mainstream. Skate punk and pop-punk bands with Gen X members such as Green Day, Rancid, and The Offspring brought widespread popularity to the genre.

==== Hard rock ====
Arguably in a similar way to punk, a sense of disillusionment, angst and anger catalysed hard rock and heavy metal to grow from the earlier influence of rock.

==== Post-punk ====
The energy generated by the punk movement launched a subsequent proliferation of weird and eclectic post-punk sub cultures, spanning new wave, goth, etc., and influencing the New Romantics.

==== Grunge ====
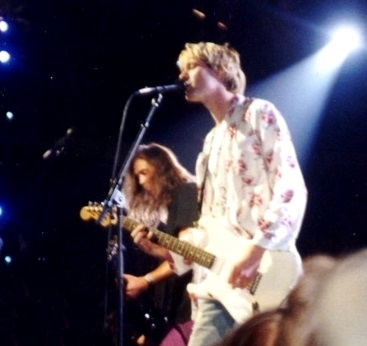
Nirvana singer Kurt Cobain (pictured here in 1992) was called the "voice of Generation X" in the 1990s, playing the same role for this demographic as Bob Dylan and John Lennon played for baby boomers in the 1960s.

A notable example of alternative rock is grunge and the associated subculture that developed in the Pacific Northwest of the U.S. Grunge lyrics have been called the "product of Generation X malaise". Vulture wrote, "the best bands arose from the boredom of latchkey kids". Producer Jack Endino said, "People made records entirely to please themselves because there was nobody else to please".

Grunge lyrics are typically dark, nihilistic, angst-filled, and anguished. They often address themes such as social alienation, despair, and apathy. The Guardian wrote that grunge "didn't recycle banal cliches but tackled weighty subjects". Topics of grunge lyrics include homelessness, suicide, rape, broken homes, drug addiction, self-loathing, misogyny, domestic abuse, and finding "meaning in an indifferent universe". Grunge lyrics tend to be introspective and aim to enable the listener to see into hidden personal issues and examine depravity. Notable grunge bands include Nirvana, Pearl Jam, Alice in Chains, Stone Temple Pilots, and Soundgarden.

==== Hip-hop ====
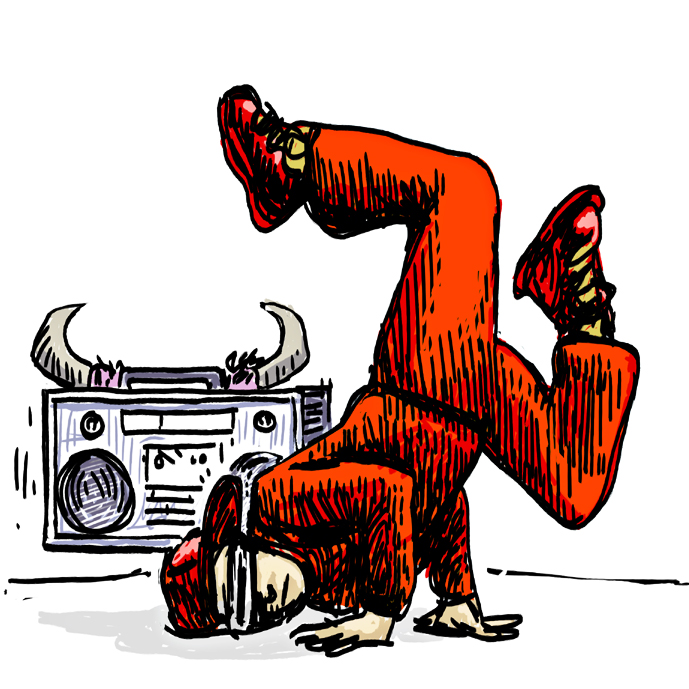
This cartoon depicts a 1980s-era dancer doing breakdancing, an African-American dance form that was a key part of hip hop culture.

The golden age of hip-hop refers to hip-hop made from the mid-1980s to mid-1990s, typically by artists from the New York metropolitan area. The music is characterized by its diversity, quality, innovation, and influence after the genre's emergence and establishment in the previous decade. It has various subject matter, while the music is experimental hip-hop and the sampling eclectic. Artists associated with the era include LL Cool J, Run–D.M.C., Eric B. & Rakim, Beastie Boys, N.W.A., De La Soul, A Tribe Called Quest, Public Enemy, Tupac Shakur, and The Notorious B.I.G.

In addition to lyrical boasting, hip-hop was also often used as social protest. Lyrics from the era often draw attention to social issues, including afrocentric living, drug use, poverty, crime and gang violence, religion, culture, the state of the U.S. economy, and the modern man's struggle. There was also often an emphasis on black nationalism. Conscious hip-hop and political hip-hop tracks of the time were a response to the effects of American capitalism and President Reagan's conservative political economy. Public Enemy's most influential song, "Fight the Power", came out at this time; the song speaks up to the government, proclaiming that people in the ghetto have freedom of speech and rights like every other American. According to Rose Tricia, "In rap, relationships between black cultural practice, social and economic conditions, technology, sexual and racial politics, and the institution policing of the popular terrain are complex and in constant motion".

=== Film ===
==== Indie films ====
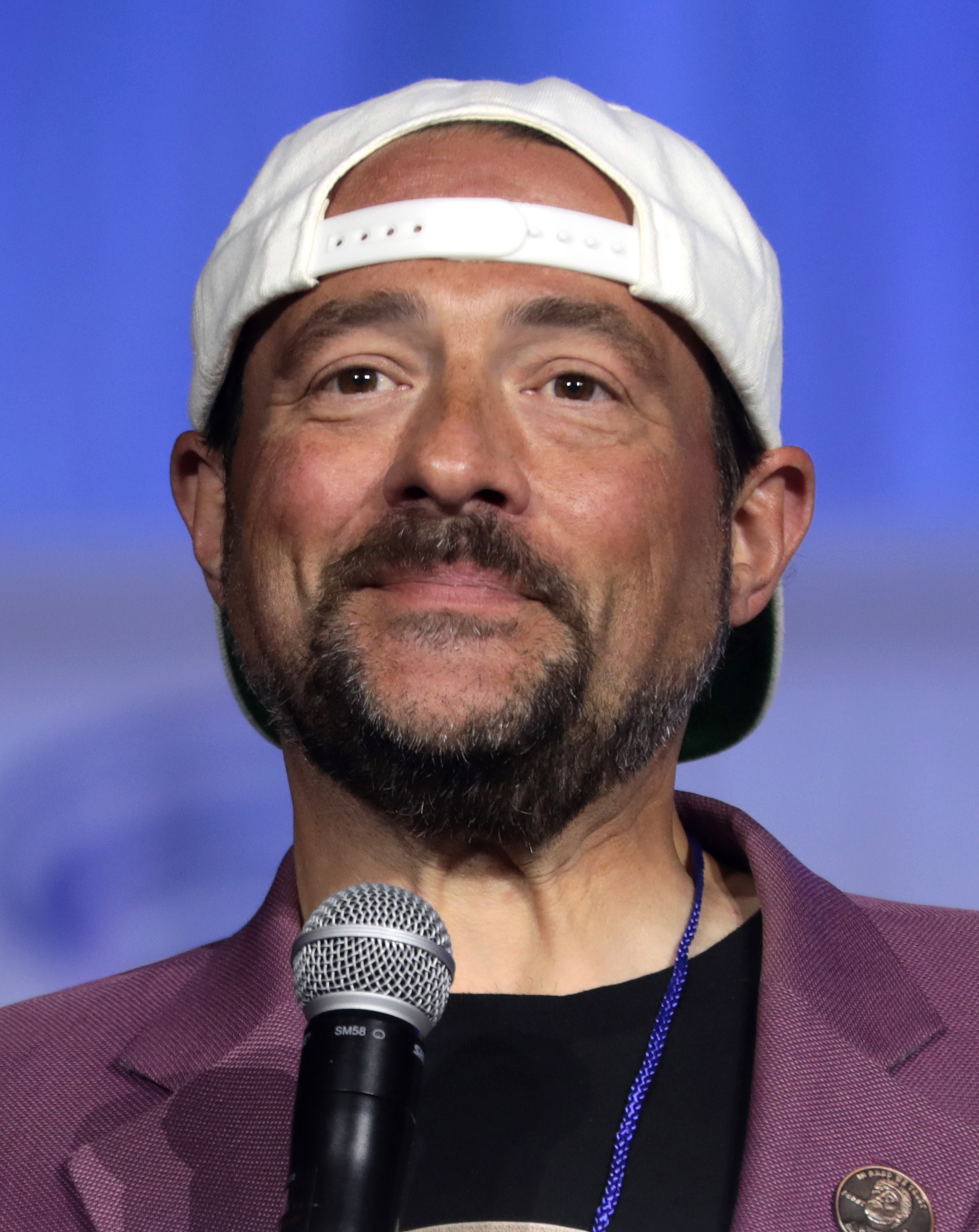
Kevin Smith is an influential Gen X indie filmmaker, his flagship film being Clerks.

Gen Xers are largely responsible for the indie film movement of the 1990s, both as directors and in large part as audiences fueling demand for such films. Increased accessibility to video mediums in the consumer market (such as VHS) supported the growth and popularity of independent film. Directors Kevin Smith, Quentin Tarantino, Sofia Coppola, Wes Anderson, John Singleton, Spike Jonze, David Fincher, Christopher Nolan, Paul Thomas Anderson, Steven Soderbergh, and Richard Linklater have been called Generation X filmmakers. Smith is best known for his View Askewniverse films, the flagship being Clerks, which is set in New Jersey circa 1994 and focuses on two convenience-store clerks in their twenties. Linklater's Slacker similarly explores young adult characters interested in philosophizing.

While not a member of Gen X himself, director John Hughes created classic 1980s teen films with early Gen X characters that "an entire generation took ownership of", including The Breakfast Club, Sixteen Candles, Weird Science, Pretty in Pink, and Ferris Bueller's Day Off.

In France, a new movement emerged, the Cinéma du look, spearheaded by filmmakers Luc Besson, Jean-Jacques Beineix, and Leos Carax. Although not Gen Xers themselves, their films Subway (1985), 37°2 le matin (English: Betty Blue; 1986), and Mauvais Sang (1986) sought to capture on screen the generation's malaise, sense of entrapment, and desire to escape.

==== Franchise mega sequels ====
The birth of franchise mega-sequels in the science fiction, fantasy, and horror fiction genres, such as the epic space opera Star Wars and the Halloween franchise, had a notable cultural influence.

=== Nostalgia ===
In the United States, there was more 1970s nostalgia among Generation X than any other generation in 1995. Gen Xers are nostalgic for the Saturday-morning cartoons of the 1970s and 1980s, such as Scooby-Doo, The Herculoids, Super Friends, Schoolhouse Rock!, The Smurfs, Transformers, G.I. Joe, and He-Man. In 2005, Generation X was less nostalgic than baby boomers. By 2016, Generation X had introduced their Generation Z children to 1980s popular culture, and as of 2018, Generation X was contributing to 1980s nostalgia. The television show Stranger Things appeals to Gen X's nostalgia for the 1980s, a time when they were coming of age, and allows their Gen Z children to see what that period was like.

=== Literature ===
The literature of early Gen Xers is often dark and introspective. In the U.S., authors such as Elizabeth Wurtzel, David Foster Wallace, Bret Easton Ellis, and Douglas Coupland captured the generation's zeitgeist. In France, Michel Houellebecq and Frédéric Beigbeder rank among major novelists whose work reflects the cohort's dissatisfaction and melancholy. In the UK, Alex Garland, author of The Beach (1996), added to the genre.

== Health problems ==
While previous research indicated that the likelihood of heart attacks was declining among Americans aged 35 to 74, a 2018 study published in the American Heart Association's journal Circulation found that this did not apply to the younger half of that cohort (controlling for age, Generation X have not seen a reduction in heart attack risk versus previous generations). Data from 28,000 patients from across the U.S. who were hospitalized for heart attacks between 1995 and 2014 showed that a growing proportion were between the ages of 35 and 54. The proportion of heart-attack patients in this age group at the end of the study was 32%, up from 27% at the start of the study. This increase is most pronounced among women, for whom the number rose from 21% to 31%. Many of those who had heart attacks also had high blood pressure, diabetes, and chronic kidney disease. These changes have been faster for women than for men. Experts suggest a number of reasons for this. Conditions such as coronary artery disease are traditionally viewed as a man's problem, and so female patients are not considered high-risk. More often than in previous generations, Generation X women are both the primary caretakers of their families and full-time employees, reducing time for self-care.

== See also ==
- Generation Jones
- Gray ceiling
- List of generations
- Xennials

Preceded by Baby Boomers; 1946–1964	Generation X 1965–1980	Succeeded by Millennials; 1981–1996
