= Ritch Savin-Williams =

American psychologist (born 1949)

Ritch C. Savin-Williams (born 1949) is professor emeritus of developmental psychology at Cornell University who specializes in gay, lesbian, and bisexual research involving adolescents.

== Education ==
Savin-Williams earned his Bachelor of Arts in psychology from the University of Missouri in 1971. He later earned an MA in religious studies in 1973 and a Ph.D. in human development in 1977 from the University of Chicago. Savin-Williams retrained in clinical psychology at the University of Massachusetts Amherst from 1989 to 1993 before completing his residency at Children's Hospital of Michigan.

== Research and activities ==
Savin-Williams's research focuses on adolescent and young adult sexual identity development and sexual minority populations. He also operates a small private practice.

Savin-Williams has appeared on Good Morning America and served as a consultant for 20/20 and The Oprah Winfrey Show.

He has served as an expert witness in court cases about gay adoption, same-sex marriage, sodomy laws, and the exclusion of gays in the Boy Scouts of America.

Savin-Williams also wrote and presented the American Psychological Association Science Directorate's developmental psychology Master Lecture.

In 2010 Savin-Williams was quoted in a New York Times article about sexuality. It read: "Professor Savin-Williams says that his current research reveals that the fastest-growing group along the sexuality continuum are men who self-identify as 'mostly straight' as opposed to labels like 'straight,' 'gay' or 'bisexual.' They acknowledge some level of attraction to other men even as they say that they probably wouldn't act on it, but … the right guy, the right day, a few beers and who knows. As the professor points out, you would never have heard that in years past."

Commenting on the article, Mark Simpson, the UK journalist, wrote: "An A ++ to Dr Savin-Williams. Not so long ago, when Heterosexuality was a proper belief system that commanded round-the-clock obeisance, 'mostly straight' would have been a heretical contradiction in terms – like half pregnant. But in this Brave New World of male neediness it's just a statement of where we're at."

== Works ==
- Adolescence: An Ethological Perspective (1987)
- Gay and Lesbian Youth: Expressions of Identity (1990)
- Beyond Pink and Blue: Exploring our Stereotypes of Sexuality and Gender (1994)
- The Lives of Lesbians, Gays, and Bisexuals: Children to Adults (1996)
- “...and then I became gay.” Young Men's Stories (1998)
- “Mom, Dad. I’m gay.” How Families Negotiate Coming Out (2001)
- The New Gay Teenager (2005)
- Becoming Who I Am: Young Men on Being Gay (2016)
- Mostly Straight: Sexual Fluidity among Men (2017)
- Bi: Bisexual, Pansexual, Fluid, and Nonbinary Youth (2021)

== Honors ==
- 2001: The American Psychological Association awarded Savin-Williams the Division 44 Distinguished Scientific Award for his work in the Psychological Study of Lesbian, Gay and Bisexual Issues.
- 2005: The American Psychological Association awarded Savin-Williams the Division 44 Distinguished Book Award for The New Gay Teenager.
