= The Erotic Minorities =

- Author: Lars Ullerstam
- Original title: De erotiska minoritertena
- Language: Swedish
- Publisher: Zindermans Förlag
- Publication date: 1964

The Erotic Minorities (originally titled De Erotiska Minoritertena) is a book by Swedish philosopher Lars Ullerstam. First published by Zindermans Förlag in 1964, it argues in favor of a wide-range societal acceptance of multiple sexual preferences, such as homosexuality, incestophilia, exhibitionism, pedophilia and other paraphilias. It is introduced by Yves de Saint-Agnès and was first translated to English by Anselm Hollo.

Ullerstam wrote in the book that although homosexuals have had their own advocacy groups, other types of stigmatized sexual groups have not. He cited that as a reason why the book was written. He argued in the book that any and all forms of sexual preferences are acceptable (he expressed limited reservation for sexual sadism) and, because they can help people achieve happiness, "ought to be encouraged". Ullerstam described "sexual deviation" as "a term of honor" and criticized other psychoanalysts for promoting "Christian and psychoanalytic myths".
