= Gray ceiling =

Theory of workplace promotion

The gray ceiling is a business/societal phenomenon where the existing workforce of those born during the baby boom era prevents the younger generations of Generation X and Millennials from advancing or being promoted at their jobs.

== General ==
The gray ceiling phenomenon is named after the better-known glass ceiling and is largely an unintentional consequence of demographics, though another factor is Boomers retiring later, due in part to the Great Recession having depleted their retirement savings. By sheer number they are also competing within their own generation and their children who are joining the workforce.

As the children of the baby boomers advance from below, the Gen-Xers, usually with middle management jobs, feel threatened and trapped in a job that is going nowhere and might be given away to the next younger candidate. Negative consequences of the gray ceiling include slowed innovation.
