= Death rates in the 20th century =

Death rates in the 20th century is the ratio of deaths compared to the population around the world throughout the 20th century. When giving these ratios, they are most commonly expressed by number of deaths per 1,000 people per year. Many factors contribute to death rates such as cause of death, increasing the death rate, an ageing population, which could increase and decrease the death rates by birth rates, and improvements in public health, decreasing the death rate.

According to the CIA World Factbook, as of July 2012, the global crude death rate is 7.99 deaths/1,000 population. The crude death rate represents the total number of deaths per year per thousand people. Comparatively, the crude death rate in the year 1900 was 17.2 deaths/1,000 population and 9.6 deaths/1,000 population in 1950 in the United States.

== Highest crude death rates worldwide ==
The World Fact Book

Rank	Country	Deaths/1,000 Population
1	South Africa	17.23
2	Ukraine	15.76
3	Lesotho	15.18
4	Chad	15.16
5	Guinea-Bissau	15.01
6	Central African Republic	14.71
7	Afghanistan	14.59
8	Somalia	14.55
9	Bulgaria	14.32
10	Swaziland	14.21
11	Russia	14.10
12	Belarus	13.90
13	Mali	13.90
14	Serbia	13.81
15	Estonia	13.60
16	Latvia	13.60
17	Nigeria	13.48
18	Zambia	13.40
19	Niger	13.40
20	Namibia	13.09

== Cause of death ==
Throughout the 20th century in the developed world, the leading causes of death transitioned from infectious diseases such as influenza, to degenerative diseases such as cancer and diabetes. In 1900, the leading cause of death in the United States was influenza with 202.2 deaths per 100,000 people followed by tuberculosis with 194.4, which is a curable illness today. In the middle of 20th century America, the leading cause of death was heart disease with 355.5 deaths per 100,000 followed by cancer at 139.8 deaths per 100,000. Although death rates dropped significantly in the latter part of the 20th century, the leading killers are still constant. The United States saw 192.9 people per 100,000 die from heart disease in 2010 followed by cancer with 185.9 people per 100,000.

An estimated 70–120 million people died from famine in the 20th century, of whom over half died in China. Malnutrition and hunger was also a leading cause of the global infant mortality and child mortality.

The world population in the 20th century experienced a large amount of death due to two major world wars. World War II was responsible for the most war related deaths in the 1900s with a death toll between 40,000,000 and 85,000,000 deaths. Other predominate wars in the 1900s include World War I with up to 22,000,000 deaths, the Russian Civil War with up to 9,000,000 deaths, the Afghan Civil War with up to 2,000,000 deaths, and the Mexican Revolution with up to 2,000,000 deaths. Several other major wars took place in the 20th century, such as the Iran–Iraq War, the Soviet–Afghan War, the second Sudanese Civil War, the Korean War and the Vietnam War.

It is estimated that traffic collisions caused the death of around 60 million people during the 20th century.

== Ageing population ==
A natural population increase occurs when birth rates are higher than death rates. Recently and most notably, the years immediately after World War II saw an explosion in fertility rates called the Baby Boom because the returning soldiers and displaced people started new families. Death rates were significantly lower during the baby boom and thus populations increased substantially. Today these baby boomers are approaching old age and driving up the average age of the overall population. The World Bank predicts a dramatic decrease in population size from the increase in death rates over the next decade.

Fertility rates and consequently live birth rates declined over the century, while age-adjusted death rates fell more dramatically. Children in 1999 were 10 times less likely to die than children in 1900.

For adults 24–65, death rates have been halved. The death rate for Americans aged 65 to 74 fell from nearly 7% per year to fewer than 2% per year.

== Improvements in public health ==
During the 20th century, an enormous improvement in public health led to an overall decrease in death rates. Infant mortality rates and maternal mortality rates have dramatically decreased. In the early 1900s, 6–9 women died in pregnancy-related complications for every 1,000 births, while 100 infants died before they were 1 year old. In 1999, at the end of the century, the infant mortality rate in the United States declined more than 90% to 7.2 deaths per 1,000 live births. Similarly, maternal mortality rates declined almost 99% to less than 0.1 reported deaths per 1,000 live births.

There are a variety of causes for this steep decline in death rates in the 20th century:

- Environmental interventions
- Improvement in nutrition
- Advances in clinical medicine (sulfonamide in 1937, penicillin in the 1940s)
- Improved access to health care
- Improvements in surveillance and monitoring disease
- Increases in education levels
- Improvement in standards of living.

Despite these tremendous decreases in infant mortality and maternal mortality, the 20th century experienced significant disparities between minority death rates compared to death rates for white mothers. In the 1900s, black women were twice as likely to die while giving birth compared to white women. Towards the end of the 20th century, black women are three times as likely to die while giving birth. This disparity is often cited as a lack in stronger Health care in the United States.

== See also ==
- List of countries by death rate
- List of countries by life expectancy
- Birth rate
- Mortality rate
