= Agequake =

1999 book by Paul Wallace

- Author: Paul Wallace
- Language: English
- Genre: Economics, demographics
- Published: September 1, 1999
- Publication place: United States
- Pages: 276 pp

Agequake: Riding the Demographic Rollercoaster Shaking Business, Finance and our World is a book written by Paul Wallace and published in 1999, that investigates the possible ramifications and implications as a significant and unprecedented portion of the human population ages. The book argues that increasing longevity and lower fertility is causing a seismic shift in the profile of populations worldwide, and will be a fundamental force that will severely affect business and finance, along with lifestyles and attitudes. Wallace suggests the old bogey of overpopulation is being replaced by a population "implosion".

Through using dependency ratios (the ratio of non-working dependents to the working population) will lead to a point where workers will be burdened with the fiscal and practical responsibilities of supporting a ballooning population of retired elderly citizens. Society and economy will be affected as the proportion of youth declines - typically the most entrepreneurial, creative and risk-taking segment of society. Along with the liquidation of baby boomer assets to pay for their retirements, this is likely to halt economic growth in the future, and economic stagnation may be a more likely prospect. Housing prices will plummet, and the world may experience the greatest downward market in history.

Internationally the relationship between the young and aggressive developing world and the wealthy older Organisation for Economic Co-operation and Development (OECD) countries (where elderly women will become an influential constituency) will change.

== See also ==
- Generational accounting
