= Lars Ullerstam =

Swedish psychiatrist and sexologist (born 1935)

- Born: Lars Gustaf Adolf Ullerstam; April 22, 1935 (age 91)
- Occupations: Psychiatrist, sexologist, researcher, author

Lars Gustaf Adolf Ullerstam (born April 22, 1935) in Vanersborg, Sweden, is a psychiatrist, sexologist, and author best known for his 1964 book, De erotiska minoritertena (released in the United States in 1966 under the title, The Erotic Minorities.) In Sweden, Ullerstam was one of the most influential figures arguing for sexual liberation of the 1960s. The book, as of 2015, had been translated into 8 languages.

== The Erotic Minorities ==
The Erotic Minorities argued against the concept of perversion as a category. While he defended homosexuality, most of the content of his book centered around other sexual practices and desires, such as pedophilia, zoophilia, prostitution, necrophilia, and BDSM. Ullerstam argued for state-backed brothels as mental health care, claiming that framing prostitution in this way would create "sexual Samaritans" who would staff the brothels. He accepted the criminalization of pedophilia, but did not believe that it was possible for pedophiles to repress their desires and believed that it was only conditioning that made pedophilia wrong. Ullerstam also argued against the restriction of pornography.
