= Ascribed characteristics =

In the social sciences, ascribed characteristics are properties of an individual attained at birth, by inheritance, or through the aging process. The individual has very little, if any, control over these characteristics. Typical examples include race, ethnicity, gender, caste, height, and appearance. The term is apt for describing characteristics chiefly caused by "nature" (e.g. genetics) and for those chiefly caused by "nurture" (e.g. parenting during early childhood), see: Nature versus nurture.

== Use within demography ==
Demography being the statistical study of populations requires the ability to differentiate between populations. Most populations self-ascribe themselves as being different from others by the creation of a country. This allows demographers to draw lines between countries and compare them. However useful, countries have significant complex populations that require more exacting definitions. Commonly seen are uses of race, gender and ethnicity. In the scope of academic demography, all of these are social constructs, ascribed to groups or individuals for stratification. With these theories in place, many new theories can be formed and data collected to either prove or disprove them. Ascribed characteristics can have large by-products, whether perceived or not. Discussed below are race, gender, social status / caste and hiring / promotion.

=== Race ===
Ascribed characteristics are not always used for academic purposes. People with certain ascribed characteristics can be systematically treated with prejudice. Thus, the study of racism can be seen, at least superficially, as the study of the ways that people with a certain skin color and cultural background are systematically treated differently by society at large.

=== Gender ===
Frank van Tubergen studied the how ascribed characteristics and achieved characteristics affect their social capital in the article "Personal networks in Saudi Arabia: The role of ascribed and achieved characteristics". The article highlighted that women have less social capital than men in Saudi Arabia citing specifically that it was "due to fewer non-family connections". There are many arguments that stem from disagreements over the definition of what is a fact when it comes to gender, showing the fluidity of ascribed characteristics. For example, people who find homosexuality morally objectionable may attempt to justify this by insisting that homosexuals make a conscious decision about the nature of the sexual desire they experience; however, it would difficult to condemn homosexuality if homosexuality was predetermined, either genetically or from early childhood. (See Sexual orientation.) Both groups do, however, use the term all the same, simply ascribing different definitions to those individuals.

=== Social status / caste ===
Many different societies have had varying types of social stratification both historically and in the modern era. One of the most obvious examples is India, and its caste system. In its essence, it was a system that ascribed sweepers the lowest status, making this one group literally untouchable, although India officially states that discrimination against lower castes is illegal.

=== Hiring / promotion ===
Ronald P. Dore was a British sociologist that was a specialist in the Japanese economy. His view will be expressed here. In his largest work, British Factory, Japanese Factory, Dore investigates whether decisions on hiring and promotion, in the Japanese firm Hitachi, over a particular time were based chiefly on "achievement" or chiefly on "ascribed characteristics". The context of the discussion implied that achievement-based decisions are good, while those based on ascribed characteristics are bad. His discussion admits explicitly and, implicitly, that there are several complications to moral judgement that include:

- Some achievement characteristics are positively correlated with some ascribed characteristics such as intelligence and socioeconomic success. For example, "the power to command...may be much more likely to be bred in upper class families" to the extent that "the power to command" is viewed as a measure of merit. Promotion decisions favoring high merit would not be entirely distinguishable from making promotion decisions favoring high class thus, it can be difficult, to tell whether a particular promotion decision has been made for just or unjust reasons.
- It is possible to, "irrelevantly acquire discriminatory characteristics", or even do so intentionally. For example, by converting to a new religion or getting married.
- It is reasonable to view even some ascribed characteristics as factors that should affect employee compensation. In Hitachi, for example, pay is positively correlated both with performance and with age. The latter is an ascribed characteristic, but Dore suggests that it is a perfectly reasonable consideration, especially since expenses such as childcare, tend to increase over the duration of employment at Hitachi.

Dore also points out that what counts as an ascribed characteristic can vary depending on context. In evaluating the fairness of hiring standards, he viewed an applicant's success in the educational system as a good approximation of achievement. Thus, he noted that hiring decisions at Hitachi, during the time of his study, were "regulated by very strict qualification standards" and not very significantly influenced by ascribed characteristics. When he turned to evaluate opportunities for advancement within the firm, however, Dore noted that "educational qualifications...limit the range of posts which one can achieve", meaning even if one's level of achievement increases, one may still be kept down by a relative lack of achievement in the educational system. Therefore, in investigating opportunities for promotions, educational achievement "the two become another form of ascribed characteristic." These additional forms of ascribed characteristics expand on the definition of an ascribed characteristic allowing for it to have more applications.
