= Certification =

Formal attestation of certain characteristics of an object, person, or organization

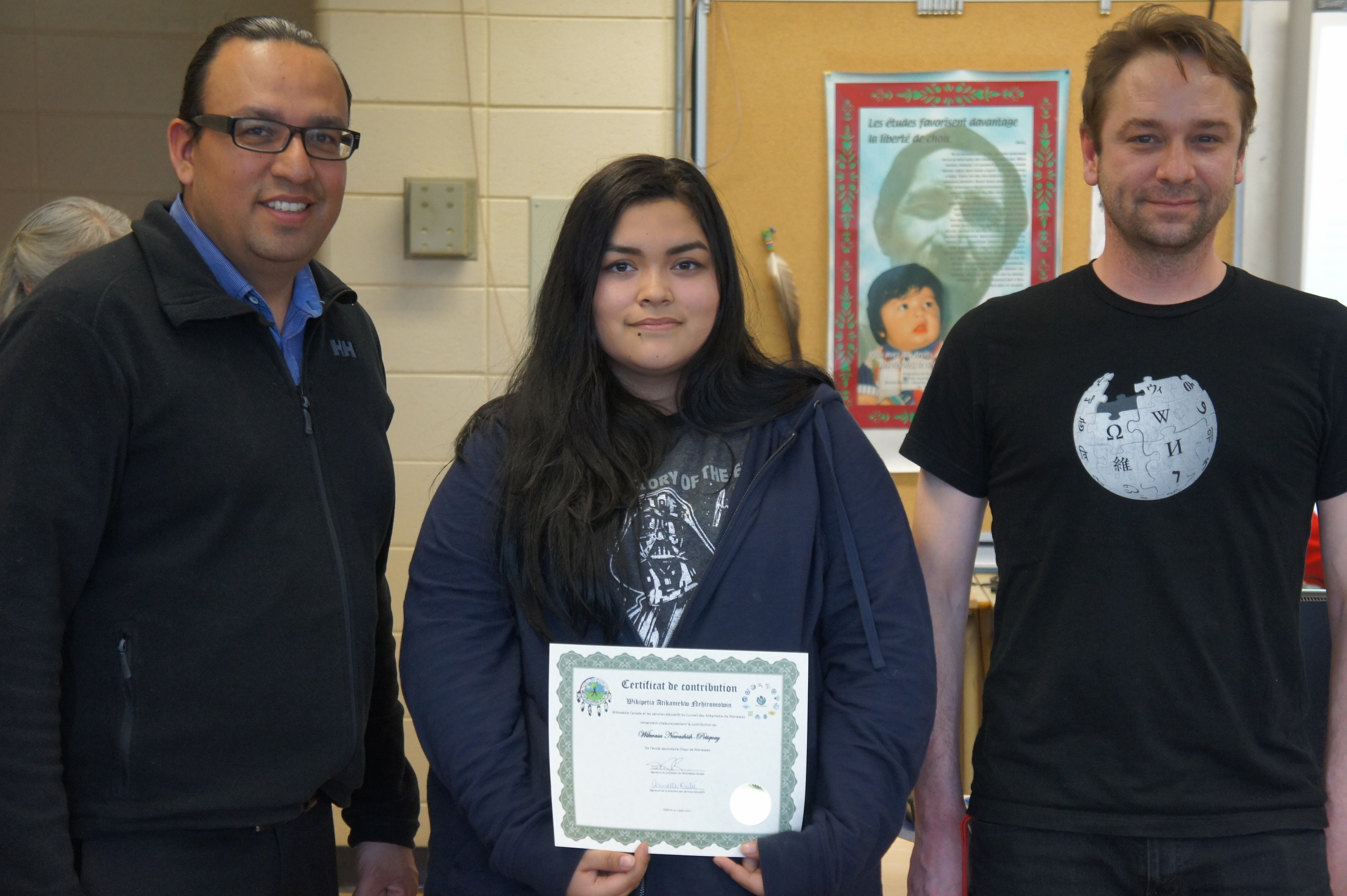
An Atikamekw woman receives a certificate for completing a Wikipedia editing workshop (2017)

Certification is part of testing, inspection and certification and the provision by an independent body of written assurance (a certificate) that the product, service or system in question meets specific requirements. It is the formal attestation or confirmation of certain characteristics of an object, person, or organization. This confirmation is often, but not always, provided by some form of external review, education, assessment, or audit. Accreditation is a specific organization's process of certification. According to the U.S. National Council on Measurement in Education, a certification test is a credentialing test used to determine whether individuals are knowledgeable enough in a given occupational area to be labeled "competent to practice" in that area.

As a rule, certificates must be renewed and periodically reviewed by a certifying regulatory body responsible for the validity of the certificate's assessment methods. The certifying body can be either a state authority or an independent private company. Certificates may even be issued by the companies themselves that use them, primarily as a marketing gimmick, which can be characterized as "cheap talk," meaning a trick that does not guarantee trust.

A study conducted by the Certification Board of Computing Professionals (CBCP) showed that the average salary increase for IT professionals who obtained CompTIA certificates was 15%. Similarly, a study by the Project Management Institute (PMI) found that certified PMP® project managers earn on average 20% more than their non-certified counterparts.

== Types ==
One of the most common types of certification in modern society is professional certification, where a person is certified as being able to competently complete a job or task, usually by the passing of an examination and/or the completion of a program of study. Some professional certifications also require that one obtain work experience in a related field before the certification can be awarded. Some professional certifications are valid for a lifetime upon completing all certification requirements. Others expire after a certain period of time and have to be maintained with further education and/or testing.

Certifications can differ within a profession by the level or specific area of expertise to which they refer. For example, in the IT Industry there are different certifications available for software tester, project manager, and developer. Also, the Joint Commission on Allied Health Personnel in Ophthalmology offers three certifications in the same profession, but with increasing complexity.

Certification does not designate that a person has sufficient knowledge in a subject area, only that they passed the test. This of course apples only to exam-based certifications. Education-based certifications, require that a person completes a course of study that satisfies certain body of knowledge claims to demonstrate that the person has sufficient knowledge in the subject area.

Certification does not refer to the state of legally being able to practice or work in a profession. That is licensure. Usually, licensure is administered by a governmental entity for public protection purposes and a professional association administers certification. Licensure and certification are similar in that they both require the demonstration of a certain level of knowledge or ability.

Another common type of certification in modern society is product certification. This refers to processes intended to determine if a product meets minimum standards, similar to quality assurance. Different certification systems exist in each country. For example, in Russia it is the GOST R Rostest.

Other types include:

- A type certificate is issued to signify the airworthiness of an aircraft manufacturing design
- Academic degrees
- Cyber security certification
- Digital signatures in public-key cryptography
- Digital certification
- Diving certification
- Environmental certification
- Film certification, also known as the motion picture rating system
- Food safety certification
- Music recording sales certification, such as "Gold" or "Platinum"
- Nursing credentials and certifications
- Professional certification (computer technology)
- Sustainability certification
- Testing, inspection and certification

== Standards and Certification ==
Certification is dependent on meeting specific requirements that are defined in a technical standard. This is either an international standard or a private standard. ISEAL Alliance and Global Food Safety Initiative are examples of private organizations who represent the private sector. Promoting certification in supply chains of private corporations by recognizing scheme owners who adopt private standards. In comparison, the public sector and Intergovernmental organizations (IGOs) recommend international standards. Scheme owners using private standards require scheme fees, which is typically an annual payment for issuing a certificate. Whereas international standards do not allow scheme ownership and do not require fees to issue a certificate. Further differences between international standards and private standards are explained in a paper from ISO.

== Attestations of conformity ==
Attestations of conformity can be made:

- First-party attestations of conformity, an individual or organization providing the good or service offers assurance that it meets certain claims.
- Second-party attestations of conformity, an association to which the individual or organization belongs provides the assurance.
- Third-party attestations of conformity, also referred to as third party certification, involves an independent and impartial assessment performed by a certification body, also referred to as conformity assessment body, declaring that specified requirements pertaining to a product, person, process, or management system have been met.

In the European Union, a notified Body is an organization accredited by an accreditation body for the purpose of providing third-party certification and testing services of the standards and regulations within the purview of the accreditation body. This serves to enforce regulatory compliance with these codes, and gives providers of goods and services a means of demonstrating compliance by way of an official certification mark or a declaration of conformity.

== In software testing Certifications ==
For software testing, the certifications can be grouped into exam-based and education-based. For exam-based certifications the candidate must pass an exam, which can also be learned by self-study. For example, for International Software Testing Qualifications Board Certified Tester by the International Software Testing Qualifications Board or Certified Software Tester by QAI or Certified Software Quality Engineer by American Society for Quality. Education-based certifications are the instructor-led sessions, where each course has to be passed. The Certified Software Test Professional (CSTP), the Certified Agile Software Test Professional (CASTP), the Certified Test Manager (CTM) and other certifications by Institute for Software Testing are such examples. It is common for people who require certifications to undergo paid structured learning to help them achieve their goals.

== Certification based on participation or participation-based guarantee systems ==
In certification systems based on participation, certification is developed by a network of participants, such as groups of producers and consumers. These systems are based on trust and networks for sharing knowledge and experience. In such cases, we refer to them as participatory guarantee systems.

The advantages of participatory certification lie in the exchange of knowledge and experience among the participants themselves, allowing for the inclusion of macro issues such as environmental, economic-financial, and social quality criteria, as well as providing small entrepreneurs with access to independent third-party certification as part of a group.

== See also ==
- Credentialism and degree inflation
- Diploma mill
- Tech certificate
