= Ledward =

Ledward is a surname, and may refer to:

- Daphne Ledward (born 1945), English gardener
- Gilbert Ledward (1888–1960), English sculptor
- Jack Ledward (1909–1997), Australian cricketer and cricket administrator
- Richard Arthur Ledward (1857–1890), English sculptor, father of Gilbert Ledward
- Rodney Ledward (1938–2000), English obstetrician and gynaecologist
- Thomas Ledward, figure of the Mutiny on the Bounty

== See also ==
- Ledward, a character in the 2017 film Alien: Covenant
- Ledward Barracks, an installation at the U.S. Army Garrison Schweinfurt
- Ledward Kaapana (born 1948), Hawaiian musician
