= Quality mark =

Quality mark may refer to:

- Certification mark
- State quality mark of the USSR
