= Semi-pro =

Semi-pro or semi-professional may refer to:

- Semi-professional sports
- Semi-Pro, a 2008 sports comedy starring Will Ferrell, Woody Harrelson, and Andre Benjamin
- A first-season episode of Law & Order: Criminal Intent

== See also ==
- Semiprofession, an occupation that requires advanced knowledge and skills but is not widely regarded as a true profession
- Paraprofessional, a job title given to persons in various occupational fields, who are trained to assist professionals but do not themselves have professional licensure
