= Technical Control Department =

To enable you write in your language and read in any language you desires

In economy of the Soviet Union and economy of Russia, Technical Control Departments (Russian: Отдел технического контроля, ОТК, OTK) were and are in charge of quality assurance of production and services.

In the late Soviet Union the OTK existed in all socialist enterprises.

== See also ==
- State Quality Mark of the USSR
- State Acceptance of Production
