= Made in Russia =

Made in Russia (Russian: Сделано в России or Изготовлено в России) is a Russian label aimed at promoting and raising awareness of Russia's exports, business, and culture in both domestic and foreign markets.

== Background ==
The Made in Russia national brand was presented to the international business community at the Milan Expo 2015 exhibition. Its presentation comprised part of Made in Russia Day at the Russian pavilion with the participation of Igor Shuvalov, the first deputy prime minister.

During the MIPCOM 2018, the Russian Export Centre showcased the Made in Russia new drama series, films and animation from leading Russian producers and channels.

== Activities ==
The logo of Made in Russia is a combination of a bar code and birch bark texture. References to business, goods production and sales, and the rich culture and history of Russian entrepreneurship are all included in the logo. The logo has been legally registered in all Nice 45 classes (International Classification of Goods and Services).

Companies that are registered, pay taxes, and create jobs in Russia are eligible to use the logo. All companies are selected and approved by the project's expert advisory board. The logo is issued free of charge for a period of one year, with the possibility of extension upon entrance into the Made in Russia register. Foreign companies may also qualify for the logo if they have joint ventures in Russia or have localized their business inside the country.

Among its other activities, Made in Russia promotes the country's non-commodity goods, attracting necessary partners and target audiences through media platforms, a multi-lingual online portal, catalogues with information about domestic export companies.

== Gallery ==
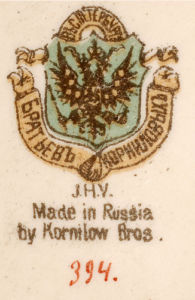
«Made in Russia», 1893

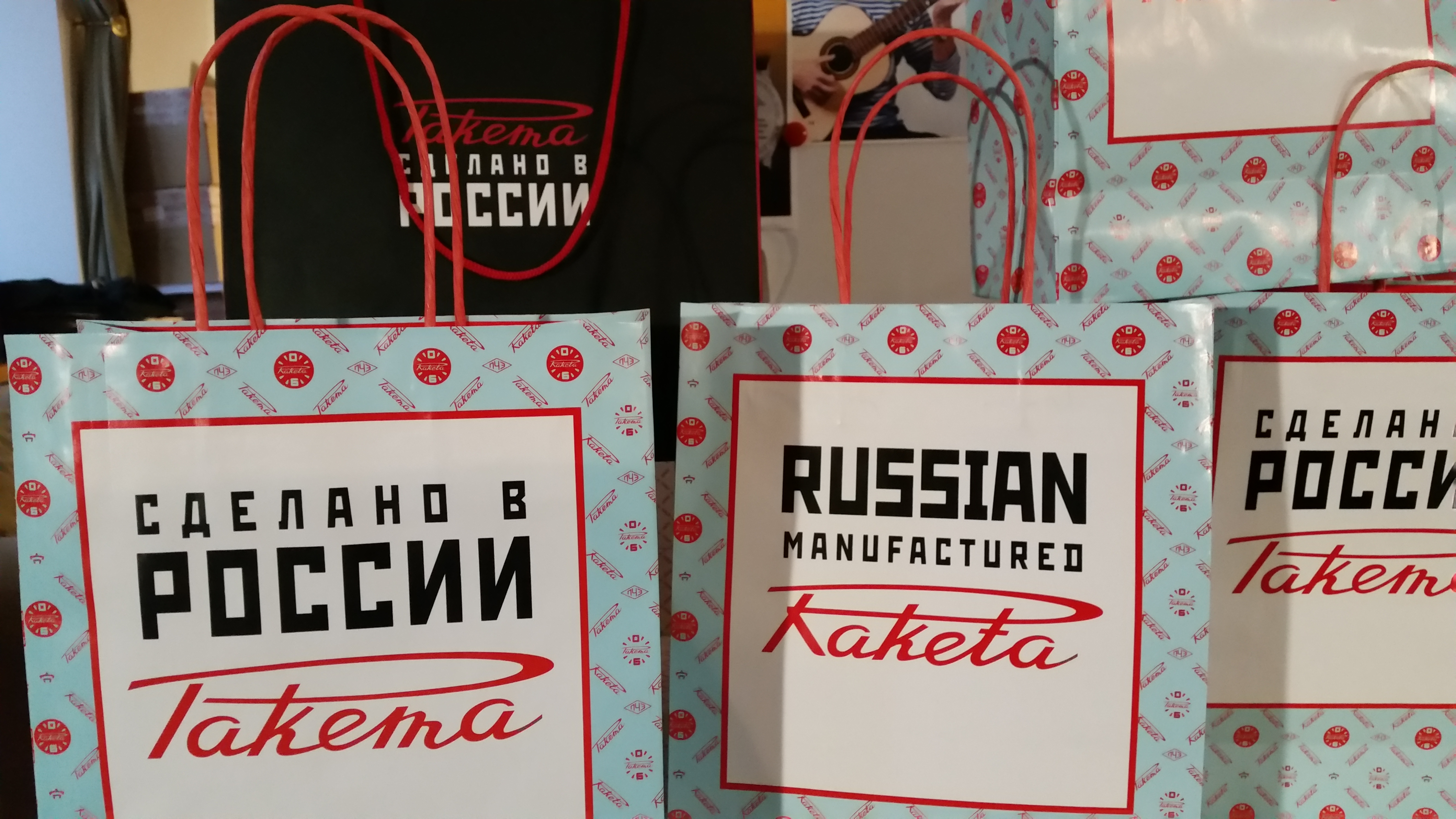
"Made in Russia" printed on a shopping bag

== See also ==
- State quality mark of the USSR
