= Occupational licensing =

Form of government regulation on professions or vocations for compensation

Occupational licensing, also called licensure, is a form of government regulation requiring a license to pursue a particular profession or vocation for compensation. It is related to occupational closure. The often stated rationale is that licensing ensures that professions provide a minimum quality standard while the drawback is that licensing leads to higher prices for those services.

Licensing creates a regulatory barrier to entry into licensed occupations. Licensing advocates argue that it protects the public interest by keeping incompetent and unscrupulous individuals from working with the public. However, there is little evidence that it affects the overall quality of services provided to customers by members of the regulated occupation. Scholars have raised concerns that licensing boards frequently enact arbitrary standards that hinder competition while also turning a blind eye towards unethical behavior by incumbent practitioners. It can also harm consumers by raising prices and reducing innovation by new market entrants, and may slow overall economic growth. Some occupational licensing can violate competition law due to anti-competitive practices.

Alternatives to individual licensing include only requiring that at least one person on a premises be licensed to oversee unlicensed practitioners, permitting of the business overall, random health and safety inspections, general consumer protection laws, and deregulation in favor of voluntary professional certification schemes or free market mechanisms such as customer review sites. Some studies find consumers are more responsive to reviews than to occupational licensing status.

== History ==
Traditionally, occupations in the crafts professions and in the liberal professions organize their respective industries in guilds and chambers in European countries like Germany and Austria. One of the most important changes in licensing has been the 2004 reform in Germany, where workers in 53 of 94 crafts professions were not required to be licensed anymore in order to start a business. In 2020, 12 of these deregulated professions reinstated the licensing requirement.

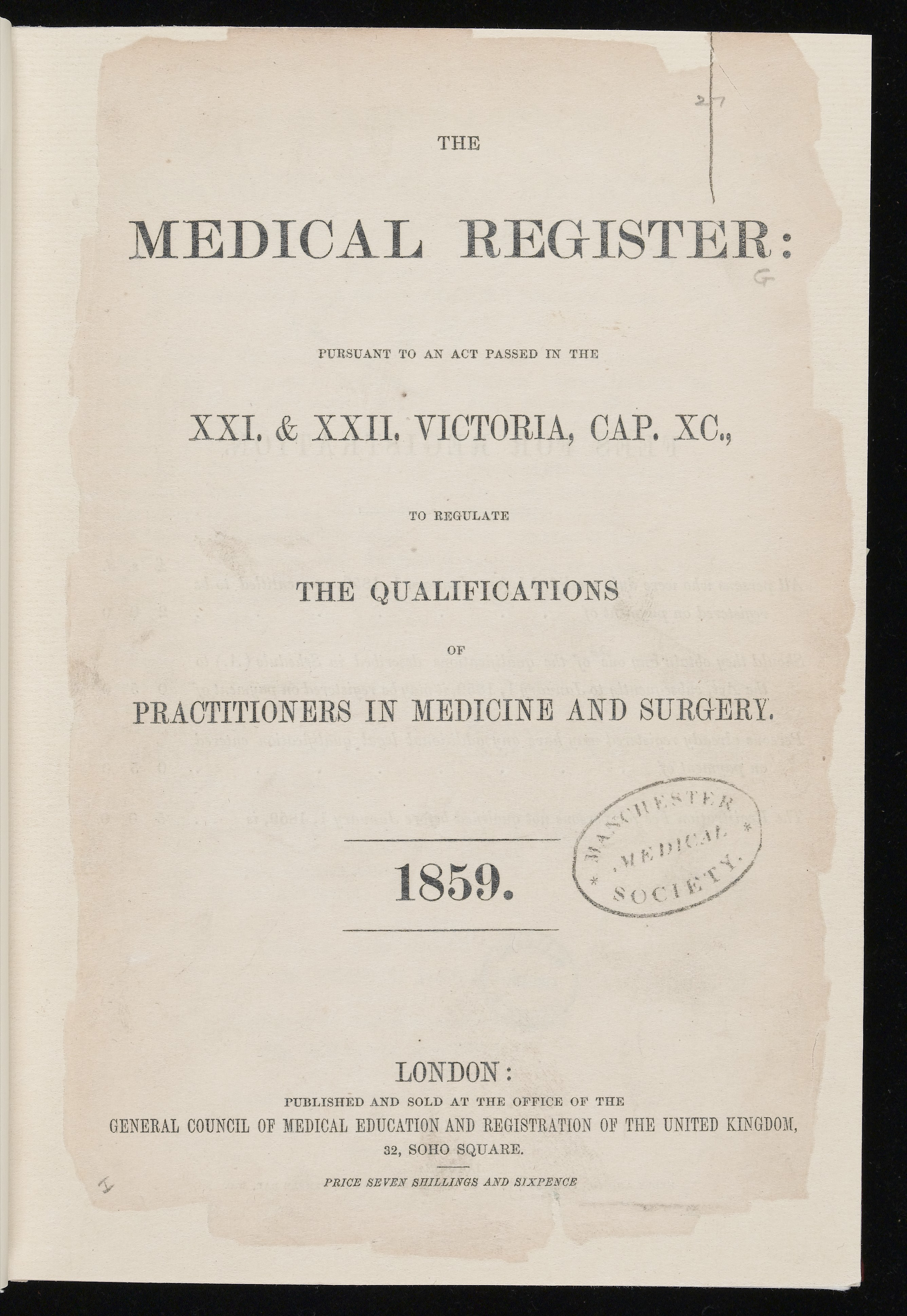
In the United Kingdom, the Medical Act 1858 established the first countrywide licensing body for doctors.

== Types ==
In the United States and Canada, licensing (the term registration is sometimes used) is usually required by law to work in a particular profession or to obtain a privilege such as to drive a car or truck. Many other privileges and professions require a license, generally from the state or provincial government, in order to ensure that the public will not be harmed by the incompetence of the practitioners, and to limit supply to incumbent practitioners and thus increase wages.

Examples of professions that require licensure in some jurisdictions include: actuary, architect, certified public accountant, electrician, engineering, general contractors, financial analyst, geologists, hedge fund manager, insurance agent, interior design, investment banker, licensed professional counselor, nurse, occupational therapist, physical therapist, plumber, private investigator, psychologist, landscape architect, lawyer, nutritionist, physician, real estate broker, speech-language pathologist, school counselor, social worker, stockbroker, surveyor, and teacher.

Licensure is similar to professional certification, and sometimes synonymous (such as in the case with teacher licensure/certification); however, certification is an employment qualification and not a legal requirement for practicing a profession. In many cases, an individual must complete certain steps, such as training, acquiring an academic degree in a particular area of study, and/or passing an exam, before becoming eligible to receive their license. There are various resources available to assist professionals with the completion of these steps. Professional associations are often a tremendous resource to individuals looking to obtain a special level of certification or licensure. Upon the successful attainment of a license, individuals append an acronym to their name, such as CPA (Certified Public Accountant) or LPD and PI (Private Detective and Investigator) PE (Professional Engineer).

=== License renewal ===
In places, licensure may still be a lifelong privilege, but increasingly nowadays, it requires periodic review by peers and renewal. It is very common for license renewal to depend, at least in part, on academia. In the United Kingdom such regular upgrading of skills is often termed continuous professional development, or CPD. In many professions this is fast becoming a standard, mandatory and annual requirement. For example, in the US, educators are subject to state re-certification requirements in order to continue teaching. The No Child Left Behind Act of 2001, enacted to improve performance in US schools, has led to an intensification of license requirements for both beginning and experienced educators. In the case of UK medical practitioners, the government has recently proposed that they should all be legally required to produce formal proof, every five years, that they are upgrading their standard of practise. This tightening of the UK medical licensing system has largely been a response to public and government unease about a series of recent and well-publicised cases of alleged medical incompetence, including the Harold Shipman case, the Alder Hey organs scandal and those involving David Southall, Rodney Ledward and Richard Neale. Such cases of medical malpractice in the 1990s are widely considered to have inspired the government to tighten professional control of medical practitioners and monitor the quality of their practice for their entire working life. One qualification for life is no longer deemed sufficient. Consequently, medical licenses can now be withdrawn when evidence of serious malpractice emerges. Currently, though such reviews of CPD are entirely voluntary, some form of professional development is already strongly encouraged within the medical profession.

== Economic theory ==
One simple theory of occupational licensing envisions a costless supply of unbiased, capable gatekeepers, and enforcers. The gatekeepers screen entrants to the occupation, barring those whose skills or character suggest a tendency toward low-quality output. The enforcers monitor incumbents and discipline those whose performance is below standard with punishments that may include revocation of the license needed to practise. Assuming that entry and performance are controlled in these ways, the quality of service in the profession will almost automatically be maintained at or above standards that are set by the gatekeeper to the profession. Within this approach, only those who have the funds to invest in training and the ability to do the work are able to enter the occupation.

Introducing economics to this otherwise mechanical model by noting that a key discipline on incumbents—the threat of revoking one's license—may not mean much if incumbents can easily re-enter the profession, such as by moving to a new firm, or by shifting to an alternative occupation with little loss of income. Since grandfathering (i.e., allowing current workers to bypass the new requirements) is the norm when occupations seek to become licensed, incumbent workers are usually supportive of the regulation process. In the absence of grandfathering, lower-skilled workers in the occupation may have to seek alternative employment. For example, if sales skills are the key to both providing licensed sales of heart monitors and the non-licensed selling of shoes or cars, then individuals may shift between these lines of work with little loss of income.

Under these circumstances, meaningful discipline for license holders may require deliberate steps to ensure that loss of license entails significant financial loss. Such additional steps could include the imposition of fines, improved screening to prevent expelled practitioners from re-entering the occupation, or requiring all incumbents to put up capital that would be forfeited upon loss of the license. To offset the possibility that incumbents could shift to other occupations with little loss of income, entry requirements could be tightened to limit supply and create monopoly rents within the licensed occupation (rent-seeking). The threat of losing these monopoly rents could, in principle, give incentives to incumbents to maintain quality standards. This may also result in some increases in human capital investments in order to attain additional requirements. The rents could also motivate potential entrants to invest in high levels of training in order to gain admittance. This suggests that licensing can raise quality within an industry by restricting supply, raising labor wages, and raising output prices. Increasing prices may signal either enhanced quality due to perceived or actual skill enhancements or restrictions on the supply of regulated workers.

State-regulated occupations can use political institutions to restrict supply and raise the wages of licensed practitioners. There is assumed to be a once-and-for-all income gain that accrues to current members of the occupation who are "grandfathered" in, and do not have to meet the newly established standard. Generally, workers who are "grandfathered" are not required to ever meet the standards of the new entrants. Individuals who attempt to enter the occupation in the future will need to balance the economic rents of the field's increased monopoly power against the greater difficulty of meeting the entrance requirements.

Once an occupation is regulated, members of that occupation in a geographic or political jurisdiction can implement tougher statutes or examination pass rates and may gain relative to those who have easier requirements by further restricting the supply of labor and obtaining economic rents for incumbents (credentialism and educational inflation). Restrictions would include raising the pass rate on licensing exams, imposing higher general and specific requirements, and implementing tougher residency requirements that limit new arrivals in the area from qualifying for a license. Moreover, individuals who have finished schooling in the occupation may decide not to go to a particular political jurisdiction where the pass rate is low because both the economic and shame costs may be high.

Conversely, efforts can be made at interstate reciprocity, so that a license or a certification earned in one federated state or province qualifies the holder to practice in any of the other states or provinces of the federation, which can lower the overall cost and burden of adequately staffing the profession in all regions. For example, high demand and low supply for nurses or for teachers, in any particular region, can be alleviated if the red tape is reduced, as long as that reduction does not truly harm competence and preparedness.

The effect of not reducing that administrative burden has been measured by a 2017 analysis that found that occupational licensing in different American states reduced between-state migration of individuals in professions with divergent licensing by 36 percent relative to members of other occupations, while workers in nationally licensed occupations showed no evidence of reduced interstate migration. A 2020 follow up study by the same authors found that "the magnitude of the effect can only account for a small part of the overall decline in [interstate migration] seen in recent decades."

== Criticism ==
"People of the same trade seldom meet together, even for merriment and diversion, but the conversation ends in a conspiracy against the public, or in some contrivance to raise prices."

— Adam Smith, The Wealth of Nations

Historically, in the professionalization process by which trades have transformed themselves into true professions, licensing fast became the method of choice in obtaining the occupational closure required by barring competition from entry to the rites and privileges of a professional group. This was initially the preferred route of regulation whether for physicians, lawyers, the clergy, accountants, bankers, scientists, engineers or architects. However, licensing has given way to membership of professional bodies, as a means of excluding competition.

Licensure restricts entry into professional careers in medicine, nursing, law, business, accounting, pharmacy, psychology, social work, teaching, engineering, surveying, and architecture. Advocates claim that licensure protects the consumer through the application of professional, educational and/or ethical standards of practice. Economist Milton Friedman opposed this practice, believing that licensure effectively raises professional salary by placing limits on the supply of specific occupations. "It is hard to regard altruistic concern for their customers as the primary motive behind their determined efforts to get legal power to decide who may be a plumber."

Restricting entry by licensing arguably maintains higher standards of service within a profession as well as acting to eliminate competition from those who provide a cheaper but (allegedly) sub-standard service. Organizations such as the American Medical Association were explicitly set up to restrict the number of practitioners. However, libertarians like Milton Friedman have argued that this process is counterproductive as it seriously restricts the number of active professionals working in society and thus unnecessarily inhibits the working of a free enterprise economy. A 2011 U.S. study estimated that occupational licenses result in 2.8 million fewer jobs, and cost the economy $203 billion per year. The number of jobs requiring a professional licensed represents an increasing fraction of the workforce, from 5% in 1950 to 22% in 2010s. Critics say that low-income consumers, who pay higher prices than required for the level of quality they might require, and low-income job seekers, are disproportionately affected.

In the United States, critics have pointed out that (as of 2018) only 60 professions are licensed by all 50 states, but about 1100 by at least one state, including tour guides, bartenders, and interior designers. If many professions are functioning satisfactorily unlicensed in the majority of states, this implies to critics that the licensing is unnecessary for consumer protection. The administrations of both President Obama and President Trump have tried to pressure state and local authorities to reduce overly burdensome licensing requirements. Excessive requirements include requiring hair braiders to have a full cosmetology license and learn about many unrelated tasks, and requiring casket salespersons to be full licensed funeral directors.

== Evidence on the effects ==
It is well understood that occupational licensing can serve as a barrier to occupational entry resulting in reduced employment, monopoly rents for workers in the occupation, and higher prices for consumers.

=== Impact on wages ===
Kleiner and Krueger (2010 and 2013) show that after controlling for education, labor market experience, occupation, and other controls, licensing is associated with a 15 to 18 percent wage premium in the labor market. This estimate may partially reflect a premium for higher unmeasured human capital, but it is also consistent and likely in large part due to rents.

A 2016 paper studying occupational licensing in the European Union estimated a wage premium of 4%, with significant variation across professions.

A study from the Mercatus Center showed that occupational licensing can lead to greater income inequality, with each step needed to open a business leading to an additional 1.4% of national income going to the top 10% of earners.

A 2019 National Bureau of Economic Research paper found that occupational licensing contributed to an average welfare loss of 12 percent.

=== Impact on employment ===
The empirical work on the effects of licensing on employment levels or growth rates, but the existing estimates suggest that they could be large. Kleiner (2006) examined employment growth rates in states and occupations with stronger versus weaker occupational licensing requirements. Specifically, he compares employment growth between 1990 and 2000 of occupations that are licensed in some states to the same occupations that are not licensed in other states. In order to account for differential growth rates between states, he also compared the growth rate of occupations that are either fully licensed or fully unlicensed in both sets of states. Using a "difference-in-difference" regression analysis, Kleiner found that partially licensed occupations had a 20 percent lower growth rate in states with licensing relative to states without licensing and relative to the difference in growth rates between these sets of states of fully licensed and fully unlicensed occupations. This estimate implies that a licensed occupation that grew at a 10 percent rate between 1990 and 2000 would have grown at a 12 percent rate if it were unregulated.

For Germany, a study exploits the deregulation of occupational licenses called Meister for 53 occupations in 2004 as a natural experiment. It finds that this policy change increased the propensity to work as self-employed substantially.

=== Impact on prices ===
Because it restricts employment, licensing can also lead to higher prices for services faced by consumers.

While it is not possible to precisely estimate the effects of substantially reducing occupational licensing at the present time, both theory and the available evidence suggest that such a reduction could translate into significantly higher employment, better job matches, and improved customer satisfaction. Low-income consumers, in particular, would benefit because reduced barriers to entry would reduce the prices of services provided.

=== Impact on quality of service provision ===
Without doing a detailed analysis at the occupation-by-occupation and state level, economists cannot say which occupations can be justified based on quality-consideration, though studies have been conducted they have found at least in a number of cases at different stages of licensing reduces employment, but does not result in better services. For example, Kleiner and Kudrle (2000) find that occupational licensing of dentists does not lead to improved measured dental outcomes of patients, but is associated with higher prices of certain services, likely because there are fewer dentists.

In the case of midwifery, the introduction of occupation licensing led to substantial reductions in maternal mortality.

=== Public safety ===
Many professions involving risk to the public do not require professional licenses. For example, chefs are generally unlicensed, though opening a restaurant may require permits, inspection, and employee training or instructional signage. Becoming a brain surgeon typically only requires a medical license; the substantial additional training and experience required to perform this operation competently is managed by the hospitals who employ the surgeons.

Restrictions to employment without licensure can prevent people with criminal records or severe mental health issues from working in occupations that require public trust. Occupations of or affected by the gambling industry, may be restricted by licensure, such as a racing secretary in horseracing, or people in the boxing, mixed martial arts, and professional wrestling industry. People whose occupations put them in physical contact with the public might also be restricted by licensure, including a barber, cosmetologist, or massage therapist. Occupations that bring a person into the home might also be screened through licensure, including a chauffeur, landscape architect, or arborist.

=== Labour mobility ===
Occupation licensing contributes to reduced labor mobility by restricting the ability of workers to switch professions.

Individuals practicing a profession in one jurisdiction where no license is required, or where licensing requirements are more lax, face problems with employment when moving to a jurisdiction with more stringent licensing. This can be particularly burdensome on families where one spouse has no choice with regard to location of work (such as military servicemembers), when the second spouse is in a licensed profession. These problems can be avoided by harmonizing laws across jurisdictions, or with reciprocity agreements where licenses from one jurisdiction are recognized in others.

With occupational licensing varying by state, another channel through which licensing can affect employment is through reduced mobility. The patchwork of regulations raises the cost of cross-state mobility for workers in these occupations. This will result in slower adjustment costs to regional economic shocks which can result in higher unemployment.

==== License portability ====
License portability refers to the legal concept where states (or other subnational certifying jurisdictions) recognize other jurisdictions licenses. Some states have mutual recognition with other states' certification either by their own state law or through interstate compact, however there are limited national standards in the United States for this issue. There has been a recent push by some professional associations to advocate for states to adopt license portability laws. Arguments for tend to rely on the changing interstate market due to remote work, telehealth, and remote therapy. Additionally there are challenges for occupations that rely on traveling for consultant work or for professionals working in branch offices across a metropolitan area that straddles a subnational border.

=== Impacts on minorities ===
A 1983 study found that some occupational licensing schemes tended to exclude minorities and disadvantaged populations from entering such trades. However, a more recent study from 2009 found the opposite.

== Alternatives ==
=== Government regulation ===
To distinguish various forms of regulation, there are three forms of government regulation of occupations:

- Licensing: Licensing refers to situations in which it is unlawful to carry out a specified range of activities for pay without first having obtained a license. This confirms that the license holder meets prescribed standards of competence. Workers who require such licenses to practice include doctors, lawyers, nurses, civil engineers, and surveyors.
- State Certification: is generally necessary in order to obtain a license to practice an occupation. The certification requirements include passing of a standardized, state-administered test and proof of minimum experience working under the supervision of a licensed practitioner. New entrants to the occupation can start working as trainees such as "apprentice electrician". Some workers in an occupation may never get certified and licensed but can continue working under the supervision of a licensed person indefinitely.
- Registration: Registration refers to situations in which one can register one's name and address and qualifications with the appropriate regulatory body. Registration provides a standard for being on the list, but complaints from consumers or improper listing of credentials can result in removal from the list.

=== Private and market-based alternatives ===
In addition to lighter forms of government regulation, quality assurance and consumer protection can be provided through non-governmental mechanisms that do not create legal barriers to entry:

- Voluntary private certification: Private organizations (including professional associations and independent certifying bodies) issue credentials to practitioners who voluntarily meet their standards of competence, skills, or ethics. These certifications signal quality to consumers but do not legally prevent uncertified individuals from practicing. They are widely used in fields such as information technology, project management, and various trades.
- Reputation systems and consumer reviews: Online review platforms, rating systems, and traditional word-of-mouth allow consumers to evaluate providers directly based on past performance. Research indicates consumers are often more responsive to reviews and ratings than to occupational licensing status.
- Private bonding, insurance, and liability: Professionals may post surety bonds or carry professional liability insurance, either voluntarily or as required by clients, insurers, or contracts. Insurers price risk accordingly, raising costs for higher-risk practitioners, while civil tort liability for negligence or fraud provides recourse and a deterrent effect.
- Third-party standards, inspections, and professional associations: Independent private entities develop and verify compliance with technical or safety standards. Markets can also rely on repeat business, brand reputation, and enforcement of ethics codes by professional associations through membership requirements and expulsion.

These mechanisms generally imposer lower costs on entry and labor mobility than mandatory licensing while still addressing information asymmetries. Policy analyses have recommended preferring private certification, bonding, insurance, registration, or market mechanisms over full licensing where risks to public health and safety are not extreme.

== By country ==
=== European Union ===
Research funded by the European Commission in 2016 estimated that around 22% of workers in the European Union were affected by occupational licensing. This varied significantly between member states, with Germany having the highest proportion (33%) affected, and Denmark the lowest (14%). The same paper also found the 'Health and Social Work' sector generally had the most licensing, but in general there was "considerably large variation" in which professions were licensed in different member states.

In 2005, the EU enacted Directive 2005/36/EC, which "enables the free movement of professionals" across Member States, by allowing licensed workers to have their professional qualifications recognised by other countries in the bloc. The European Commission records occupational licensing restrictions across the EU on its Regulated Professions Database. The subsequent 'Proportionality Directive' passed in 2018 requires national governments to assess whether new barriers to practice are proportionate to achieve objectives in the public interest.

=== United States ===
In the United States, licensing has been among the fastest-growing labor market institutions. The figure shows the growth of occupational licensing relative to the decline of union membership since the 1950s.

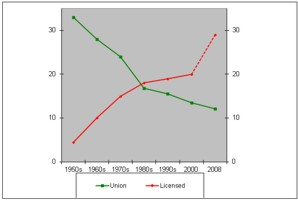
Comparison of Unions and Licensing over Time in the United States. (The dashed line shows the value from state estimates of licensing based on the Gallup Survey and PDII Survey results. The union membership estimates are from the Current Population Survey (CPS)).

By 2008 occupational licensing in the U.S. had grown to 29 percent of the workforce, up from below five percent in the 1950s. In contrast, unions represented as much as 33 percent of the U.S. workforce in the 1950s, but declined to less than 12 percent of the U.S. workforce by 2008.

In April 2019, Arizona became the first US state to recognize out-of-state occupational licenses.

== See also ==
- Baumol effect
- Employment protection legislation
- Labor economics
- Labour market flexibility
- Law and economics
- Loss aversion
- Professional certification
- Professional regulation
- Regulatory capture
- Regulatory state
- Rent-seeking
