= Medical degree =

Degree awarded to practice medicine

A medical degree is a professional degree admitted to those who have passed coursework in the fields of medicine and/or surgery from an accredited medical school. Obtaining a degree in medicine allows for the recipient to continue on into specialty training with the end goal of securing a license to practice within their respective jurisdiction. Medical graduates may also pursue non-clinical careers including those in basic research and positions within the healthcare industry.

== Undergraduate medical degrees ==
- Bachelor of Medicine, Bachelor of Surgery (MBBS, BMBS, MBChB, MBBCh)
- Bachelor of Medicine (B.Med, MB, BM)
- Bachelor of Surgery (B.S)/(B.Surg)

The MBBS is also awarded at the graduate level, meaning the applicant already has an undergraduate degree prior to commencing their medical studies (graduate entry).

== Graduate medical degrees ==
- Doctor of Medicine (MD, Dr.MuD, Dr.Med)
- Doctor of Osteopathic Medicine (DO)

== Comparison of allopathic and osteopathic medical degrees ==
Medical degree type	Undergraduate (Post-secondary)	Graduate (Post-baccalaureate)		
Medical degree type	Undergraduate (Post-secondary)			Osteopathy
Degree name	Bachelor of Medicine, Bachelor of Surgery; or Bachelor of Medicine	Bachelor of Medicine, Bachelor of Surgery	Doctor of Medicine	Doctor of Osteopathic Medicine
Post-nominal letters	MBBS, BMBS, MBChC, MBChB, MBBCh; or MB, BM, BMed	MBBS, BMBS, MBChC, MBBCh	MD	DO
Admission	Follows secondary education (standard course)	Follows an undergraduate degree (graduate-entry)	Follows an undergraduate degree (professional doctorate)	Follows an undergraduate degree (professional doctorate)
Duration	5 to 6 years	4 years (accelerated)	4 years	4 years
Countries offering the degree (not exhaustive list)	Pakistan, United Kingdom, Ireland, India, South Africa, Nigeria, Kenya, Australia, China, and Saudi Arabia	Pakistan, United Kingdom and Ireland	Pakistan, United States, Canada, Israel, UAE, Australia	United States

Some countries, especially Eastern European and former Soviet republics (Russia, Ukraine, Armenia) offer post-secondary, undergraduate, 6-year medical programs, which confer the title Doctor of Medicine as their medical qualification.

== Post-graduate medical degrees ==
- Master of Clinical Medicine (MCM)
- Master of Medical Science (MMSc, MMedSc)
- Master of Public Health (MPH)
- Master of Medicine (MM, MMed)
- Master of Philosophy (MPhil)
- Master of Philosophy in Ophthalmology (MPhO)
- Master of Public Health and Ophthalmology (MPHO)
- Master of Surgery (MS, MSurg, MChir, MCh, ChM, CM)
- Master of Science in Medicine or Surgery (MSc)
- Doctor of Medicine of by research MD(Res), DM
- Doctor of Osteopathic Medicine (DO)
- Doctor of Clinical Medicine (DCM)
- Doctor of Clinical Surgery (DClinSurg)
- Doctor of Medical Science (DMSc, DMedSc)
- Doctor of Surgery (DS, DSurg)
- Doctor of Podiatric Medicine (DPM)

== See also ==
- Credentialism and degree inflation
- Medical education
- Medical school
- Medicine
- Physician
- Surgeon
