= Occupational closure =

Restriction of an occupation to only qualified practitioners

In sociology, an occupational closure (or professional demarcation) is the process whereby a trade or occupation (vocation) transforms itself, or tries to transform itself, into a true profession by closing off entry to the profession to all but those people who are suitably qualified, as defined by the practitioners already practicing the occupation in any given jurisdiction. This can be achieved by licensure (occupational licensing) and professional certification, barring entry to all except those who have passed certain entrance examinations and grades of training, or by allowing entry only to those who have gained membership of a specific professional body (a professional association, such as a particular medical society). It can also be achieved by trade unionism, and most especially craft unionism as contrasted with industrial unionism, in countries where sufficient union membership (as a percentage of workers in an occupation) can be achieved despite the prevailing gradient of union busting.

For example, an architect or physician may firstly have to be a university graduate in their main subject, second, will have to have passed entrance examinations to join a recognised professional body and thirdly, will have to be licensed to practise architecture or medicine respectively, usually also obtained through sitting examinations. Therefore, such professions are open only to those who satisfy these requirements and are closed to everyone else. It is thus illegal for any other person to pose as an architect or to practice medicine.

Occupational closure may have both benefits and potential harms to society. It may be beneficial in ensuring high-quality service in a profession, with fewer incompetents, quacks, charlatans, and scammers. The potential harm concerns the problems of credentialism and educational inflation (forms of rent-seeking) and the creation of regional or nationwide staffing shortages induced by red tape. However, efforts to prevent these detrimental effects may also allow quality lapses (poor service quality) and malpractice to rise if done too aggressively.

In some cases, occupational licensing can be anti-competitive and violate competition law.

== History ==
The origin of this process is said to have been with guilds during the Middle Ages, when 'professionals' fought for exclusive rights to practice their crafts or trades as journeymen, and to engage unpaid apprentices.

== See also ==
- Credentialism
- Licensure
- Occupational licensing
- Profession
- Professionalization
