= State Acceptance of Production =

Official quality assurance agency in the Soviet Union

State Acceptance of Production (Russian: Государственная приёмка продукции), commonly abbreviated as State Acceptance (Russian: Государственная приёмка, Госприёмка, Gospriyomka), was a procedure of quality assurance of production of enterprises in late Soviet Union introduced under Mikhail Gorbachev within the framework of perestroika (restructuring of Soviet economy and society). The corresponding organs at the enterprises were also called Gospriyomka. The main state organ in charge was called Chief Administration of State Acceptance (Главное управление Государственной приёмки) and was subordinated to Gosstandart, This initiative failed to achieve its goals in full. After the dissolution of the Soviet Union, the organ was abolished.

== History ==
Since January 1, 1985, 19 machine-building enterprises were subject to an experiment: after the production was approved by the Technical Control Departments, a special commission created by Gosstandart performed additional selective checks. As a result, significant amounts of low-quality production were uncovered and rejected. This experience resulted in the introduction of a new procedure of quality assurance, Gospriyomka.

The statute about Gospriyomka was introduced by the Decree no. 542 of the USSR Council of Ministers on May 12, 1986.

Unlike Technical Control Departments, organs of Gospriyomka were independent of the enterprise and the state managerial structures (vedomstvo) in control of the enterprise or the corresponding industry.

Gospriyomka was put in force since January 1, 1987 at about 1500 enterprises. Later its scope widened. With the introduction of economic means of production control and the decrease of the dependence on state, such as self-financing (samofinansirovanie) and khozraschyot, Gospriyomka was destined to decrease in importance, but the collapse of the Soviet Union effectively stopped these developments.

== See also ==
- State Quality Mark of the USSR
