= Rostest =

Russian practical metrology and certification organization

Rostest mark according to GOST R 50460-92

Rostest (Russian: Ростест) is the largest organization of practical metrology and certification in the Russian Federation. Rostest attempts to ensure uniformity of measurements in industry, health care, communication systems, trading, military defense, and resource counting as well as environmental protection and other economic activities.

== History ==
The new Rostest mark of certification was introduced in Russia in 1992 and went into effect on 1 July 1993. replacing the State quality mark of the USSR. On the basis of Rostest one of the first organs was founded in Moscow for certification of products and services and the quality systems within the system of obligatory certification in the early 1990s.

== Certification in Russia ==
In order to import and sell goods in Russia it is necessary to draw up appropriate documents, including Correspondence Certificates, Correspondence Declaration, and Letters of Refusal. Rostest prepares certification documents. Rostest specialists check, calibrate, and test means of measurement. It then approves the type, the device, and the method of performing measurements.

Rostest owns a modern testing base and the most recent equipment. Cooperating institutions in Russia include: Russian Techno Regulation, Ministry of Emergency Situations (MES), Russian Consumer Rights' Supervision, and RRIS (Russian Research Institute of Certification).

== Standards ==
Rostest-Moscow conducts certification in two systems: GOST R and Rostest-Quality (Ростест-Качество).

GOST standards include:

- GOST 7.67: Country codes
- GOST 5284-84: Tushonka (canned stewed beef)
- GOST 7396: Standard for power plugs and sockets used in Russia and throughout the Commonwealth of Independent States
- GOST 10859: A 1964 character set for computers, includes non-ASCII/non-Unicode characters required when programming in the ALGOL programming language
- GOST 16876-71: A standard for Cyrillic-to-Latin transliteration (Note: Replaced by GOST 7.79-2000 in 2002.)
- GOST 27974-88: Programming language ALGOL 68
- GOST 27975-88: Programming language ALGOL 68 extended
- GOST 28147-89 block cipher – commonly referred to as just GOST in cryptography

== See also ==
- State quality mark of the USSR
