= Professionalization =

Social process of a profession's perceptual shift

Professionalization or professionalisation is a social process by which any trade or occupation transforms itself into a true "profession of the highest integrity and competence." The definition of what constitutes a profession is often contested. Professionalization tends to result in establishing acceptable qualifications, one or more professional associations to recommend best practice and to oversee the conduct of members of the profession, and some degree of demarcation of the qualified from unqualified amateurs (that is, professional certification). It is also likely to create "occupational closure", closing the profession and activities it encompasses to entry from outsiders, amateurs and the unqualified.

Occupations not fully professionalized are sometimes called semiprofessions. Critique of professionalization views overzealous versions driven by perverse incentives (essentially, a modern analogue of the negative aspects of guilds) as a form of credentialism.

== Process ==
The process of professionalization creates "a hierarchical divide between the knowledge-authorities in the professions and a deferential citizenry." This demarcation is often termed "occupational closure", as it means that the profession then becomes closed to entry from outsiders, amateurs and the unqualified: a stratified occupation "defined by professional demarcation and grade." The origin of this process is said to have been with guilds during the Middle Ages, when they fought for exclusive rights to practice their trades as journeymen, and to engage unpaid apprentices. It has also been called credentialism, a reliance on formal qualifications or certifications to determine whether someone is permitted to undertake a task or to speak as an expert. It has also been defined as "excessive reliance on credentials, especially academic degrees, in determining hiring or promotion policies.". It has been further defined as where the credentials for a job or a position are upgraded, even though, there is no skill change that makes this increase necessary.

Professions also possess power, prestige, high income, high social status and privileges; their members soon come to comprise an elite class of people, cut off to some extent from the common people, and occupying an elevated station in society: "a narrow elite ... a hierarchical social system: a system of ranked orders and classes."

The professionalization process tends to establish the group norms of conduct and qualification of members of a profession and tends also to insist that members of the profession achieve "conformity to the norm." and abide more or less strictly with the established procedures and any agreed code of conduct, which is policed by professional bodies, for "accreditation assures conformity to general expectations of the profession." Different professions are organized differently. For example, doctors desire autonomy over entrepreneurship. Professions want authority because of their expertise. Professionals are encouraged to have a lifetime commitment to their field of work.

Eliot Freidson (1923–2005) is considered one of the founders of the sociology of professions

== History ==
Very few professions existed before the 19th century, although most of the societies always valued someone who was competent and skilled in a particular discipline. The government was especially in need of skilled people to complete various duties. Professionalism as an ideology only started in the early 19th century in North America and Western Europe.

Professions began to emerge rapidly. However, a person who wanted to become a professional had to gain the approval of members of the existing profession beforehand and only they could judge whether he or she had reached the level of expertise needed to be a professional. Official associations and credentialing boards were created by the end of the 19th century, but initially membership was informal. A person was a professional if enough people said they were a professional.

Adam Smith expressed support for professionalization, as he believed that professionals made a worthwhile contribution to society. They deserved power and high salaries due to the difficulties inherent in gaining entry to professional fields and living up to the rigorous demands of professionalism.

State licensure insured that experience could not be substituted for certification, and decreased outside competition. A code of ethics for professionals ensured that the public receiving the service was well served and set guidelines for their behavior in their professions. This code also ensured that penalties were put in place for those who failed to meet up to the standards stated. This could include termination of their license to practice. After the Second World War, professions were state controlled.

The degree of legislation and autonomy of self-regulated and regular professions varied across Canada. Possible causes include societal infrastructure, population density, social ideologies, and political mandates. Physicians and engineers were among the most successful at professionalization of their work. Medicine was consistently regulated before the confederation. Medicine and engineering became self-regulated and had their regulatory legislation altered five decades after the confederation even though some other occupations were not able to. This meant these professions could oversee entry to practice, education, and the behavior of those practicing.

== Physicians ==
Physicians are a profession that became autonomous or self-regulating. Physicians started as a division of labor in health care. The social status of physicians made them feel like they merit deference. Physicians' authority was based on persuasion. Autonomy and independence of the organization of physicians caused a division of labor that is professionally dominated. Licensing caused monopolies on rights. Eliot Friedson had commented that the profession had "the authority to direct and evaluate the work of others without in turn being subject to formal direction and evaluation by them”. Doctors retained their dominance because hospitals were administered rather than managed. The medical field enjoyed more power than some other profession, for example engineering.

In the United States physicians from other countries could not practice unless they satisfied US regulation requirements.

To ensure social order and establish British institutions, Ontario established medicine as a self-regulating profession in the late 1860s. In many US states however, medicine remained unregulated until several decades later.

A publication in the 1840 British Medical Journal revealed an increase in professional consciousness from medical practitioners in England. Physicians in the 19th century came to have the features of modern professions. A major one was autonomy. This was further emphasized with the establishment of a controlling body of the profession. Competition and overcrowding (two or three decades after 1930) also put pressure on governments to establish a system of registration and requirements for those who wished to practice. This led to the Medical Act 1840. In fact, this council consisted mostly of doctors. Therefore, they were in control of regulating their own profession. The act required their members to oversee medical education, keep track of the numbers of qualified practitioners, and regulate it for the government. It gave the qualified more power and set limitations on the unqualified. The exclusion from government service of the unqualified practitioners was the most influential policy. Along with the act, the qualified practitioners came to be known as the “officially recognized” healers, and as such had a competitive advantage in the job market.

To reduce competition, the Medical Act 1858 also raised the standards for qualifications. A modern code of medical ethics was also implemented in the 19th century. Again, this proves the high degree of power that the profession had. As a result, many medical practitioners came to experience ethical problems. Unlike today, it was more the concern of the behavior of doctors towards each other, than towards their patients. It is suggested to be due by the changes of the medical world in the first half of the 19th century. Unlike the pre-industrial age, distinctions between say surgeons and physicians were greatly reduced, to replace a division of mostly consultants and general practitioners.

This new division caused disorder in establishing the roles of different types of practitioners and their status. It led to more competition as their various field of expertise was not made clear and thus resulted in accusations of unprofessional conduct among each other to protect their own interests. Issues, around management of medical practitioners and their practice stemming from this change, had to be attended to. In the second half of the 19th century, ethics were more severely monitored and disciplinary action against violators was put in effect. This was allowed as by the Medical Act 1858. Even the allowance to remove from practice any practitioner violating the code of ethics put in place. A more elaborated code of professional ethics emerged. A practitioner had no other choice but to adhere to minimum standards if he wanted to keep his job and keep practicing.

The 19th-century education to become a physician encountered some changes from the 18th century. The 18th century was an apprenticeship program. The apprentice and master worked together and so the level of training received varied from person to person varied. In the 19th century, hospital medical schools and universities gained popularity for teaching. Apprenticeships were reducing rapidly. Training became more standardized. It was standardized more all over the world too because medical students that attended these schools came from all over the world. With this came a sense of professional identity and community made possible this modern profession seen today.

With the professionalization of medicine came the emergence of the movement of physical diagnoses of physicians' patients in the 19th century. It was believed to help treat patients better. Before the emergence of this movement, physicians based their diagnoses on the interpretation of their patients’ symptoms. Physical diagnoses became part of the modern professional practice of medicine. It was one of the major accomplishments of Parisian hospitals and with the rise of Parisian pathological-anatomy, it became a very important clinical practice. Disease was believed to be an anatomical lesion inside the body. Physical examination was necessary to properly qualify them. This new approach caused the problem of the growing diagnostic competence but smaller treatment capacities. As well, this caused a pressure on the physician to find and classify the illness but also to treat and cure the disease. Skepticism grew in the profession as fellow physicians watched each other for proper treatment of patients.

The invention of the stethoscope in 1816 made auscultation and percussion regularly employed to help in the physical diagnosis process. Diagnose and treatment now had to be based on science. The rise of hospitals facilitated physical diagnoses. That being said, patients were often reluctant to undergo physical diagnosis, especially with the rise of new medical instruments being used. In fact, manuals were written to help physicians gain knowledge on proper “patient etiquette” and gain their consent to perform certain procedures. Society had a hard time accepting the procedures required for the routine physical examination and its necessity. It was more interested in the cure and treatment effectiveness of the diagnosis.

The industrialization in the late 19th century resulted in a demand for physicians. In Canada, the industrializing towns and cities of the Maritimes gave plenty of opportunities for their physicians to show their skills as emerging professionals. For example, medical doctors were needed to inspect tenement housing, and sanitary conditions of factories and schools. Doctors were needed to promote public and personal hygiene to reduce disease transmission.

Medical failures often hampered the reputation of these physicians which made their status as professionals harder to implement and make the general population accept them as this. Not to mention over-crowding eventually became a problem. the profession called on the government for help especially in the last quarter of the 19th century. Restriction on who could get in medical schools, and higher demands on their education were put in place. As well, greater attentions to their professional ethics were among the strategies employed to distinguish themselves as high status professionals. Physicians also pressured the government for better attention to the health of its citizens. For example, the recollection of data of the births and deaths which it had stopped doing in the Maritimes in 1877. Provincial medical boards, allowance of registration for practice across all provinces, better schools, protection against the unlicensed physicians and unskilled persons, were some other actions taken.

Although medical techniques did approve in the nineteenth century, attempts to deny rights for the other competing professions in the health field made it seem like medical doctors wanted to monopolize medical care and seek their own interests rather the public welfare.

== Engineers ==
Engineering, as it became a profession, had fewer restrictions in the 19th century. As it did not have mandatory licensing for entrants, competition was bigger. Unlike physicians, engineers could not enjoy protection from competition. For instance, a person without a college degree could still become an engineer. Engineers could be independent. It was a semi-autonomous profession because it could still require extended training and it formed body of specialized knowledge. The nature of their work meant that they were always influenced by business and industry. In many cases they did want to be independent. Oftentimes, they sought power through their connection with an organization. The engineer profession was much more collaborative.

In Canada, Interprofessional conflict, differences in organization, and state lobby caused the differences in timing and legislature of occupations such as engineering.

In engineering, the profession was initially just organized on a national or cross-provincial basis. For example, the Canadian Society of Civil Engineers was formed in 1887 before it was regulated in each province. Even then, legislation from province to province varied. This was due to the resistance and oppositions of the people in all provinces. For example, in Ontario, the act on engineering did not pass until 1922, and it had to be altered to exempt all mining operations from the bill. This was because the mining industry was afraid the act would alert business and the ability to hire whoever they wanted During times of rapid growth, regulations were added or altered to starve off over crowding.

In the 19th century, an engineer qualified to practice in England would not have trouble practicing in Canada. To obtain an engineer's certificate from them these countries, many demands which had to be met. For example, in Ontario Canada, for each different class of engineer certificate obtained, certain math skills must be met first. To practice as a water supply engineer in Victoria, Australia, a person had to obtain a certificate. This certificate was only granted if the provisions under the state's Water Act 1890 (No. 1156) were met.

In England, because production was controlled by craftsmen, creativity and quality of the product was seen as dominant factors in the emerging engineering profession. During the Industrial revolution, whereas the United States focused its attention to standardization for mass production, England focused on methods of small-scale manufacturing. English engineers still emphasized quality in their work. Learning by practical experience was also strongly encouraged and training new engineers became like an apprenticeship.

In France, they were more concern with the theoretical aspect of engineering, specifically understanding the mathematical aspect of it. They built “grandes écoles" of engineering and state employment was the most predominant work for engineering. Engineering practices and education depended upon cultural values and preferences. Oftentimes in the US, business and engineer managers influenced engineer work.

In the United States, engineering was more focused on experience and achieving material and commercial success. Manual labor was seen as something positive. It was influenced by France to build schools for engineering training rather than on the site training, in the late 19th century. Professional status was gained through corporate training. Unlike the other emerging professions mentioned earlier, engineering as a profession did not reply on the approval of their peers but rather of corporate and government hierarchies (private industry).

The number of engineers increased by 2000 percent in the period between 1880 and 1920 in the United States. The Industrial revolution created a demand for them. Their main competition was Germany. Industries encouraged engineering to change from a craft to a profession. The standardization of practices during this time helped established their professional image as expertise. That being said, many factory and business and factory owners did not particularly like this standardization because they felt threaten that engineers would increase their authority and territory. This was also desired by engineers themselves to end labor troubles. It was believed that it would increase production and predictability.

Civil engineers were overtaken by mechanical engineers. In fact, the numbers of professional mechanical engineers increased by 600 percent and college enrollment in this specialization outnumbered civil engineering. Now, they were more needed. Engineers were okay being classified "professionals of a corporation", because they were still mostly industry workers anyway and valued the ideology of no government intervention in the economy.

Shortly before, and during the Progressive Era, better organization of various fields of work including engineering took place because it encouraged professionalism, equality, and progress. Systematization was a big part of it. For example, The American Society of Mechanical Engineer was founded in 1880, and met twice a year. Professional codes of ethics were also established for this profession. However, the growing profession of engineering had still difficulty in organizing itself.

Making a professional image of engineers was difficult because of its prominent association with manual labor. It struggles to this day to gain similar status as members of autonomous, self-regulating professions such as lawyers and physicians.

== See also ==
- Grade inflation
- Occupational licensing

== Bibliography ==
- Andrew Delano Abbott, The System of Professions: Essay on the Division of Expert Labour, University of Chicago Press, 1988
- Adams, Tracey L. (August 2009). "Regulating Professions in Canada: Interprovincial Differences across Five Provinces". Journal of Canadian Studies. 43 (3): 194–221. doi:10.3138/jcs.43.3.194. S2CID 141980888. Project MUSE 390309.
- Jeffrey L. Berlant, Profession and Monopoly: A Study of Medicine in the United States and Great Britain, University of California Press, 1975. (ISBN 0-520-02734-5)
- Charlotte G. Borst, Catching Babies: Professionalization of Childbirth, 1870–1920, Harvard University Press, 1995
- Darity, William A., ed. (2008). "Professionalization". International Encyclopedia of the Social Sciences. Vol. 6. pp. 515–517. Gale CX3045302074.
- Robert Dingwall, Essays on Professions. Aldershot, England: Ashgate, 2008.
- Eyre and Spottiswoode, Professional handbook, dealing with professions in the colonies / issued by the Emigrants Information Office Early Canadiana Online., 1892.
- Eliot Freidson, Profession of Medicine: A Study of the Sociology of Applied Knowledge, University of Chicago Press, 1970
- Howell, Colin D. (1981). "Reform and the Monopolistic Impulse: The Professionalization of Medicine in the Maritimes". Acadiensis. 11 (1): 3–22. JSTOR 30302689. PMID 11620109.
- Hall, Richard H. (1968). "Professionalization and Bureaucratization". American Sociological Review. 33 (1): 92–104.
- Merle Jacobs and Stephen, E Bosanac, The Professionalization of Work, Whitby, ON: de Sitter Publications, 2006
- Montagna, Paul D. (1968). "Professionalization and Bureaucratization in Large Professional Organizations". American Journal of Sociology. 74 (2): 138–145.
- Johnson, Terence James (1972). Professions and Power. Macmillan. ISBN 978-0-333-13430-6.
- Benton, John F. (1985). "Trotula, Women's Problems, and the Professionalization of Medicine in the Middle Ages". Bulletin of the History of Medicine. 59 (1): 30–53. JSTOR 44452036. PMID 3886049. ProQuest 1296295309.
- Alice Beck Kehoe, Mary Beth Emmerichs, and Alfred Bendiner, Assembling the Past: Studies in the Professionalization of Archaeology, University of New Mexico Press, 2000, ISBN 978-0-8263-1939-5.
- Lori Kenschaft, Professions and Professionalization., Oxford University Press, 2008
- Lachmund, Jens (November 1998). "Between Scrutiny and Treatment: Physical Diagnosis and the Restructuring of 19th Century Medical Practice". Sociology of Health & Illness. 20 (6): 779–801. doi:10.1111/1467-9566.00129.
- Magali Sarfatti Larson, The Rise of Professionalism: a Sociological Analysis, Berkeley, California: University of California Press, 1978
- Gary R. Lowe and P. Nelson Reid, The Professionalization of Poverty: Social Work and the Poor in the Twentieth Century (Modern Applications of Social Work), Aldine de Gruyter, 1999
- Downey, Gary Lee; Lucena, Juan C. (December 2004). "Knowledge and professional identity in engineering: code-switching and the metrics of progress". History and Technology. 20 (4): 393–420. doi:10.1080/0734151042000304358. S2CID 110549230.
- Keith M. Macdonald, The Sociology of the Professions, Sage, 1995
- Linda Reeser, Linda Cherrey, and Irwin Epstein, Professionalization and Activism in Social Work, Columbia University Press, 1990, ISBN 0-231-06788-7
- Patricia M. Schwirian, Professionalization of Nursing: Current Issues and Trends, Philadelphia: Lippencott, 1998, ISBN 0-7817-1045-6
- Shenhav, Yehouda (1995). "From Chaos to Systems: The Engineering Foundations of Organization Theory, 1879-1932". Administrative Science Quarterly. 40 (4): 557–585. doi:10.2307/2393754. JSTOR 2393754. Gale A18194328 ProQuest 203973104.
- Howard M Vollmer, and D L Mills, Professionalization, New Jersey: Prentice Hall, 1966
- Waddington, I (3 October 1990). "The movement towards the professionalization of medicine". BMJ. 301 (6754): 688–690. doi:10.1136/bmj.301.6754.688. JSTOR 29709099. PMC 1664090. PMID 2224238.
- Anne Witz, Professions and Patriarchy, London: Routledge, 1992
- Donald Wright, The Professionalization of History in English, University of Toronto Press, 2005
