= GOST 7.67 =

GOST 7.67 is GOST standard for country codes and codes of Russian federal subjects (regions).

The standard defines country names in Russian and English language, Cyrillic three-letter country codes, Latin three- and two-letter country codes, and numeric country codes. The latter three are the same as ISO 3166 codes (though, in practice, differences can arise due to changes in ISO 3166 that are still not introduced in GOST 7.67, for example three-letter code for Romania ROM, which is changed to ROU).

In 2005 new edition GOST 7.67-2003 was released. The updated GOST was based on ISO 3166-1:1997 standard and replaced the earlier version GOST 7.67-1994. It was approved by the CIS members and entered into force as CIS international standard МКС 01.140.20. The new standard incorporates the changes that happened before 2003 and also lists Russian, Belarusian, Tajik and Kazakh regions and their codes. Part of the Russian regions are coded with two-letter code; the standard is, however, three-letter regional coding. The codes for certain Russian regions in GOST 7.67 differ from ISO 3166-2:RU regional codes, for example RU-SPB vs. RU-SPE respectively for Saint-Petersburg.

== GOST 7.67-94 Country codes ==
Country name	Russian name	Cyrillic code	Latin 3-letter code	Latin 2-letter code	Numeric code
Afghanistan	Афганистан	АФГ	AFG	AF	4
Albania	Албания	АЛБ	ALB	AL	8
Algeria	Алжир	АЛЖ	DZA	DZ	12
American Samoa	Восточное Самоа	ВОС	ASM	AS	16
Andorra	Андорра	АНД	AND	AD	20
Angola	Ангола	АНГ	AGO	AO	24
Anguilla	Ангилья	АНА	AIA	AI	660
Antarctica	Антарктика	АНК	ATA	AQ	10
Antigua and Barbuda	Антигуа и Барбуда	АНР	ATG	AG	28
Argentina	Аргентина	АРГ	ARG	AR	32
Armenia	Армения	АРМ	ARM	AM	51
Aruba	Аруба	АРУ	ABW	AW	533
Australia	Австралия	АВС	AUS	AU	36
Austria	Австрия	АВТ	AUT	AT	40
Azerbaijan	Азербайджан	АЗЕ	AZE	AZ	31
Bahamas	Багамские Острова	БАГ	BHS	BS	44
Bahrain	Бахрейн	БАХ	BHR	BH	48
Bangladesh	Бангладеш	БАН	BGD	BD	50
Barbados	Барбадос	БАР	BRB	BB	52
Belarus	Белоруссия (Беларусь)	БЕИ	BLR	BY	112
Belgium	Бельгия	БЕЛ	BEL	BE	56
Belize	Белиз	БЕЗ	BLZ	BZ	84
Benin	Бенин	БЕН	BEN	BJ	204
Bermuda	Бермудские Острова	БЕР	BMU	BM	60
Bhutan	Бутан	БУТ	BTN	BT	64
Bolivia	Боливия	БОЛ	BOL	BO	68
Bosnia and Herzegovina	Босния и Герцеговина	БОС	BIH	BA	70
Botswana	Ботсвана	БОТ	BWA	BW	72
Bouvet Island	Буве, остров	БУВ	BVT	BV	74
Brazil	Бразилия	БРА	BRA	BR	76
British Indian Ocean Territory	Британская территория в Индийском океане	БРИ	IOT	IO	86
Brunei	Бруней	БРУ	BRN	BN	96
Bulgaria	Болгария	БОГ	BGR	BG	100
Burkina Faso	Буркина-Фасо	БУК	BFA	BF	854
Burundi	Бурунди	БУР	BDI	BI	108
Cambodia	Камбоджа	КАК	KHM	KH	116
Cameroon	Камерун	КАМ	CMR	CM	120
Canada	Канада	КАН	CAN	CA	124
Cape Verde	Кабо-Верде	КАБ	CPV	CV	132
Cayman Islands	Кайман, Острова	КАЙ	CYM	KY	136
Central African Republic	Центральноафриканская Республика	ЦЕН	CAF	CF	140
Chad	Чад	ЧАД	TCD	TD	148
Chile	Чили	ЧИЛ	CHL	CL	152
China	Китай	КИТ	CHN	CN	156
Christmas Island	Рождества (Кристмас), Остров	РОЖ	CXR	CX	162
Cocos (Keeling) Islands	Кокосовые (Килинг) острова	КОК	CCK	CC	166
Colombia	Колумбия	КОЛ	COL	CO	170
Comoros	Коморские Острова	КОМ	COM	KM	174
Republic of the Congo	Конго	КОН	COG	CG	178
Democratic Republic of the Congo	Заир	ЗАИ	ZAR	ZR	180
Cook Islands	Кука, Острова	КУК	COK	CK	184
Costa Rica	Коста-Рика	КОС	CRI	CR	188
Croatia	Хорватия	ХОР	HRV	HR	191
Cuba	Куба	КУБ	CUB	CU	192
Cyprus	Кипр	КИП	CYP	CY	196
Czech Republic	Чешская Республика	ЧЕШ	CZE	CZ	203
Denmark	Дания	ДАН	DNK	DK	208
Djibouti	Джибути	ДЖИ	DJI	DJ	262
Dominica	Доминика	ДОМ	DMA	DM	212
Dominican Republic	Доминиканская Республика	ДОН	DOM	DO	214
Ecuador	Эквадор	ЭКА	ECU	EC	218
Egypt	Египет	ЕГИ	EGY	EG	818
El Salvador	Сальвадор	САЛ	SLV	SV	222
Equatorial Guinea	Экваториальная Гвинея	ЭКВ	GNQ	GQ	226
Eritrea	Эритрея	ЭРИ	ERI	ER	232
Estonia	Эстония	ЭСТ	EST	EE	233
Ethiopia	Эфиопия	ЭФИ	ETH	ET	231
Falkland Islands (Malvinas)	Фолклендские (Мальвинские) Острова	ФОЛ	FLK	FK	238
Faroe Islands	Фарерские острова	ФАР	FRO	FO	234
Fiji	Фиджи	ФИД	FJI	FJ	242
Finland	Финляндия	ФИН	FIN	FI	246
France	Франция	ФРА	FRA	FR	250
France, Metropolitan	Франция, Метрополия	ФРМ	FXX	FX	249
French Guiana	Гвиана Французская	ГВИ	GUF	GF	254
French Polynesia	Французская Полинезия	ФРП	PYF	PF	258
French Southern Territories	Французские Южные территории	ФРЮ	ATF	TF	260
Gabon	Габон	ГАБ	GAB	GA	266
Gambia	Гамбия	ГАМ	GMB	GM	270
Georgia	Грузия	ГРУ	GEO	GE	268
Germany	Германия	ГЕР	DEU	DE	276
Ghana	Гана	ГАН	GHA	GH	288
Gibraltar	Гибралтар	ГИБ	GIB	GI	292
Greece	Греция	ГРИ	GRC	GR	300
Greenland	Гренландия	ГРЕ	GRL	GL	304
Grenada	Гренада	ГРА	GRD	GD	308
Guadeloupe	Гваделупа	ГВА	GLP	GP	312
Guam	Гуам	ГУА	GUM	GU	316
Guatemala	Гватемала	ГВЕ	GTM	GT	320
Guinea	Гвинея	ГВН	GIN	GN	324
Guinea-Bissau	Гвинея-Бисау	ГВЯ	GNB	GW	624
Guyana	Гайана	ГАЙ	GUY	GY	328
Haiti	Гаити	ГАИ	HTI	HT	332
Heard Island and McDonald Islands	Херд и Макдональд, острова	ХЕМ	HMD	HM	334
Honduras	Гондурас	ГОН	HND	HN	340
Hong Kong	Сянган (Гонконг)	СЯН	HKG	HK	344
Hungary	Венгрия	ВЕН	HUN	HU	348
Iceland	Исландия	ИСЛ	ISL	IS	352
India	Индия	ИНД	IND	IN	356
Indonesia	Индонезия	ИНЗ	IDN	ID	360
Iran	Иран	ИРН	IRN	IR	364
Iraq	Ирак	ИРК	IRQ	IQ	368
Ireland	Ирландия	ИРЯ	IRL	IE	372
Israel	Израиль	ИЗР	ISR	IL	376
Italy	Италия	ИТА	ITA	IT	380
Ivory Coast	Кот-д'Ивуар	КОТ	CIV	CI	384
Jamaica	Ямайка	ЯМА	JAM	JM	388
Japan	Япония	ЯПО	JPN	JP	392
Jordan	Иордания	ИОР	JOR	JO	400
Kazakhstan	Казахстан	КАЗ	KAZ	KZ	398
Kenya	Кения	КЕН	KEN	KE	404
Kiribati	Кирибати	КИР	KIR	KI	296
Korea, Democratic People's Republic of	Корейская Народно- Демократическая Республика	КОО	PRK	KP	408
Korea, Republic of	Корея, Республика	КОР	KOR	KR	410
Kuwait	Кувейт	КУВ	KWT	KW	414
Kyrgyzstan	Киргизия (Кыргызстан)	КИР	KGZ	KG	417
Laos	Лаос	ЛАО	LAO	LA	418
Latvia	Латвия	ЛАТ	LVA	LV	428
Lebanon	Ливан	ЛИВ	LBN	LB	422
Lesotho	Лесото	ЛЕС	LSO	LS	426
Liberia	Либерия	ЛИБ	LBR	LR	430
Libya	Ливия	ЛИИ	LBY	LY	434
Liechtenstein	Лихтенштейн	ЛИХ	LIE	LI	438
Lithuania	Литва	ЛИТ	LTU	LT	440
Luxembourg	Люксембург	ЛЮК	LUX	LU	442
Macau	Аомынь (Макао)	АОМ	MAC	MO	446
Madagascar	Мадагаскар	МАГ	MDG	MG	450
Malawi	Малави	МАЕ	MWI	MW	454
Malaysia	Малайзия	МАЗ	MYS	MY	458
Maldives	Мальдивы	МАЛ	MDV	MV	462
Mali	Мали	МАИ	MLI	ML	466
Malta	Мальта	МАМ	MLT	MT	470
Marshall Islands	Маршалловы Острова	МАШ	MHL	MH	584
Martinique	Мартиника	МАТ	MTQ	MQ	474
Mauritania	Мавритания	МАВ	MRT	MR	478
Mauritius	Маврикий	МАБ	MUS	MU	480
Mayotte	Маоре (Майотта)	МАО	MYT	YT	175
Mexico	Мексика	МЕК	MEX	MX	484
Micronesia, Federated States of	Микронезия (Федеративные Штаты Микронезии)	МИК	FSM	FM	583
Moldova	Молдавия (Молдова)	МОЛ	MDA	MD	498
Monaco	Монако	МОН	MCO	MC	492
Mongolia	Монголия	МОО	MNG	MN	496
Montserrat	Монтсеррат	МОТ	MSR	MS	500
Morocco	Марокко	МАР	MAR	MA	504
Mozambique	Мозамбик	МОЗ	MOZ	MZ	508
Myanmar	Мьянма	МЬЯ	MMR	MM	104
Namibia	Намибия	НАМ	NAM	NA	516
Nauru	Науру	НАУ	NRU	NR	520
Nepal	Непал	НЕП	NPL	NP	524
Netherlands	Нидерланды	НИД	NLD	NL	528
New Caledonia	Новая Каледония	НОК	NCL	NC	540
New Zealand	Новая Зеландия	НОЗ	NZL	NZ	554
Nicaragua	Никарагуа	НИК	NIC	NI	558
Niger	Нигер	НИА	NER	NE	562
Nigeria	Нигерия	НИГ	NGA	NG	566
Niue	Ниуэ	НИУ	NIU	NU	570
Norfolk Island	Норфолк	НОФ	NFK	NF	574
North Macedonia	Северная Македония	МАД	MKD	MK	807
Northern Mariana Islands	Северные Марианские Острова	СЕВ	MNP	MP	580
Norway	Норвегия	НОР	NOR	NO	578
Oman	Оман	ОМА	OMN	OM	512
Pakistan	Пакистан	ПАК	PAK	PK	586
Palau	Палау	ПАЛ	PLW	PW	585
Panama	Панама	ПАН	PAN	PA	591
Papua New Guinea	Папуа — Новая Гвинея	ПАП	PNG	PG	598
Paraguay	Парагвай	ПАР	PRY	PY	600
Peru	Перу	ПЕР	PER	PE	604
Philippines	Филиппины	ФИЛ	PHL	PH	608
Pitcairn	Питкэрн	ПИТ	PCN	PN	612
Poland	Польша	ПОЛ	POL	PL	616
Portugal	Португалия	ПОР	PRT	PT	620
Puerto Rico	Пуэрто-Рико	ПУЭ	PRI	PR	630
Qatar	Катар	КАТ	QAT	QA	634
Reunion	Реюньон	РЕЮ	REU	RE	638
Romania	Румыния	РУМ	ROM	RO	642
Russian Federation	Российская Федерация	РОФ	RUS	RU	643
Rwanda	Руанда	РУА	RWA	RW	646
Saint Helena	Святой Елены, Остров	СВЯ	SHN	SH	654
Saint Kitts and Nevis	Сент-Китс и Невис	СЕС	KNA	KN	659
Saint Lucia	Сент-Люсия	СЕТ	LCA	LC	662
Saint Pierre and Miquelon	Сен-Пьер и Микелон	СЕП	SPM	PM	666
Saint Vincent and the Grenadines	Сент-Винсент и Гренадины	СЕР	VCT	VC	670
Samoa	Западное Самоа	ЗАС	WSM	WS	882
San Marino	Сан-Марино	САН	SMR	SM	674
São Tomé and Príncipe	Сан-Томе и Принсипи	САТ	STP	ST	678
Saudi Arabia	Саудовская Аравия	САУ	SAU	SA	682
Senegal	Сенегал	СЕН	SEN	SN	686
Seychelles	Сейшельские Острова	СЕЙ	SYC	SC	690
Sierra Leone	Сьерра-Леоне	СЬЕ	SLE	SL	694
Singapore	Сингапур	СИН	SGP	SG	702
Slovakia	Словакия	СЛА	SVK	SK	703
Slovenia	Словения	СЛО	SVN	SI	705
Solomon Islands	Соломоновы Острова	СОЛ	SLB	SB	90
Somalia	Сомали	СОМ	SOM	SO	706
South Africa	Южно-Африканская Республика	ЮЖН	ZAF	ZA	710
South Georgia and South Sandwich Islands	Южная Георгия и Южные Сандвичевы острова	ЮЖГ	SGS	GS	239
Spain	Испания	ИСП	ESP	ES	724
Sri Lanka	Шри-Ланка	ШРИ	LKA	LK	144
Sudan	Судан	СУД	SDN	SD	736
Suriname	Суринам	СУР	SUR	SR	740
Svalbard and Jan Mayen	Свальбард и Ян-Майен	СВБ	SJM	SJ	744
Swaziland	Свазиленд	СВА	SWZ	SZ	748
Sweden	Швеция	ШВЕ	SWE	SE	752
Switzerland	Швейцария	ШВА	CHE	CH	756
Syria	Сирия	СИР	SYR	SY	760
Republic Taiwan (Province of China)	Тайвань (провинция Китая)	ТАЙ	TWN	TW	158
Tajikistan	Таджикистан	ТАД	TJK	TJ	762
Tanzania	Танзания	ТАН	TZA	TZ	834
Thailand	Таиланд	ТАИ	THA	TH	764
Timor-Leste	Восточный Тимор	ВОТ	TMP	TP	626
Togo	Того	ТОГ	TGO	TG	768
Tokelau	Токелау	ТОК	TKL	TK	772
Tonga	Тонга	ТОН	TON	TO	776
Trinidad and Tobago	Тринидад и Тобаго	ТРИ	TTO	TT	780
Tunisia	Тунис	ТУН	TUN	TN	788
Turkey	Турция	ТУЦ	TUR	TR	792
Turkmenistan	Туркменистан	ТУР	TKM	TM	795
Turks and Caicos Islands	Теркс и Кайкос	ТрР	TCA	TC	796
Tuvalu	Тувалу	ТУВ	TUV	TV	798
Uganda	Уганда	УГА	UGA	UG	800
Ukraine	Украина	УКР	UKR	UA	804
United Arab Emirates	Объединенные Арабские Эмираты	ОБЭ	ARE	AE	784
United Kingdom	Великобритания	ВЕЛ	GBR	GB	826
United States	Соединенные Штаты Америки (США)	СОЕ	USA	US	840
United States Minor Outlying Islands	Мелкие отдаленные острова США	МЕЛ	UMI	UM	581
Uruguay	Уругвай	УРУ	URY	UY	858
Uzbekistan	Узбекистан	УЗБ	UZB	UZ	860
Vanuatu	Вануату	ВАН	VUT	VU	548
Vatican City State (Holy See)	Ватикан	ВАТ	VAT	VA	336
Venezuela	Венесуэла	ВЕС	VEN	VE	862
Vietnam	Вьетнам	ВЬЕ	VNM	VN	704
Virgin Islands (British)	Виргинские Острова (Британские)	ВИБ	VGB	VG	92
Virgin Islands (U.S.)	Виргинские Острова (США)	ВИР	VIR	VI	850
Wallis and Futuna Islands	Уоллис и Футуна	УОЛ	WLF	WF	876
Western Sahara	Западная Сахара	ЗАП	ESH	EH	732
Yemen	Йемен	ЙЕМ	YEM	YE	887
Yugoslavia	Югославия	ЮГО	YUG	YU	891
Zambia	Замбия	ЗАМ	ZMB	ZM	894
Zimbabwe	Зимбабве	ЗИМ	ZWE	ZW	716

== GOST 7.67-2003 Country Codes (common for CIS countries) ==
Country Name (EN)	Country Name (RU)	Code (EN)		Code (RU)	Code (Num)
Afghanistan	Афганистан	AF	AFG	АФГ	4
Albania	Албания	AL	ALB	АЛБ	8
Antarctica	Антарктика	AQ	ATA	АНК	10
Algeria	Алжир	DZ	DZA	АЛЖ	12
American Samoa	Американское Самоа	AS	ASM	АМС	16
Andorra	Андорра	AD	AND	АНД	20
Angola	Ангола	АО	AGO	АНГ	24
Antigua and Barbuda	Антигуа и Барбуда	AG	ATG	АНР	28
Azerbaijan	Азербайджан	AZ	AZE	АЗЕ	31
Argentina	Аргентина	AR	ARG	АРГ	32
Australia	Австралия	AU	AUS	АВС	36
Austria	Австрия	AT	AUT	АВТ	40
Bahamas	Багамы	BS	BHS	БАГ	44
Bahrain	Бахрейн	BH	BHR	БАХ	48
Bangladesh	Бангладеш	BD	BGD	БАН	50
Armenia	Армения	AM	ARM	АРМ	51
Barbados	Барбадос	BB	BRB	БАР	52
Belgium	Бельгия	BE	BEL	БЕЛ	56
Bermuda	Бермуды	BM	BMU	БЕР	60
Bhutan	Бутан	ВТ	BTN	БУТ	64
Bolivia	Боливия	ВО	BOL	БОЛ	68
Bosnia and Herzegovina	Босния и Герцеговина	BA	BIH	БОС	70
Botswana	Ботсвана	BW	BWA	БОТ	72
Bouvet Island	Буве, остров	BV	BVT	БУВ	74
Brazil	Бразилия	BR	BRA	БРА	76
Belize	Белиз	BZ	BLZ	БЕЗ	84
British Indian Ocean Territory	Британская территория в Индийском океане	IO	IOT	БРИ	86
Solomon Islands	Соломоновы острова	SB	SLB	СОЛ	90
Virgin Islands (British)	Виргинские острова (Британские)	VG	VGB	ВИБ	92
Brunei Darussalam	Бруней-Даруссалам	BN	BRN	БРУ	96
Bulgaria	Болгария	BG	BGR	БОГ	100
Myanmar	Мьянма	MM	MMR	МЬЯ	104
Burma see Myanmar Burundi	Бурунди	Bl	BDI	БУР	108
Belarus	Беларусь	BY	BLR	БЕИ	112
Cambodia	Камбоджа	KH	KHM	КАК	116
Cameroon	Камерун	CM	CMR	КАМ	120
Canada	Канада	CA	CAN	КАН	124
Cape Verde	Кабо-Верде	CV	CPV	КАБ	132
Cayman Islands	Кайман, острова	KY	CYM	КАЙ	136
Central African Republic	Центрально-Африканская Республика	CF	CAF	ЦЕН	140
Sri Lanka	Шри-Ланка	LK	LKA	ШРИ	144
Chad	Чад	TD	TCD	ЧАД	148
Chile	Чили	CL	CHL	ЧИЛ	152
China see also Hong Kong, Macau, Taiwan	Китай см. также Аомынь (Макао), Гонконг, Тайвань	CN	CHN	КИТ	156
Taiwan, Province of China	Тайвань, провинция Китая	TW	TWN	ТАЙ	158
Christmas Island	Рождества (Кристмас), остров	CX	CXR	РОЖ	162
Cocos (Keeling) Islands	Кокосовые (Килинг) острова	CC	CCK	КОК	166
Colombia	Колумбия	CO	COL	КОЛ	170
Comoros	Коморы	KM	СОМ	КОМ	174
Mayotte	Маоре (Майотта)	YT	MYT	МАО	175
Congo (Brazzaville)	Конго (Браззавиль)	CG	COG	КОН	178
Congo (Kinshasa)	Конго (Киншаса)	CD	COD	КОО	180
Cook Islands	Кука, острова	CK	СОК	КУК	184
Costa Rica	Коста-Рика	CR	CRI	КОС	188
Croatia	Хорватия	HR	HRV	ХОР	191
Cuba	Куба	CU	CUB	КУБ	192
Cyprus	Кипр	CY	CYP	КИП	196
Czech Republic	Чешская Республика (Чехия)	CZ	CZE	ЧЕХ	203
Benin	Бенин	BJ	BEN	БЕН	204
Denmark	Дания	DK	DNK	ДАН	208
Dominica	Доминика	DM	DMA	ДОМ	212
Dominican Republic	Доминиканская Республика	DO	DOM	ДОН	214
Ecuador	Эквадор	EC	ECU	ЭКА	218
El Salvador	Сальвадор	SV	SLV	САЛ	222
Equatorial Guinea	Экваториальная Гвинея	GQ	GNQ	ЭКВ	226
Ethiopia	Эфиопия	ET	ETH	ЭФИ	231
Eritrea	Эритрея	ER	ERI	ЭРИ	232
Estonia	Эстония	ЕЕ	EST	ЭСТ	233
Faroe Islands	Фарерские острова	FO	FRO	ФАР	234
Falkland Islands (Malvinas)	Фолклендские (Мальвинские) острова	FK	FLK	ФОЛ	238
South Georgia and South Sandwich Islands	Южная Георгия и Южные Сандвичевы острова	GS	SGS	ЮЖГ	239
Fiji	Фиджи	FJ	FJI	ФИД	242
Finland	Финляндия	Fl	FIN	ФИН	246
France, Metropolitan	Франция, Метрополия	FX	FXX	ФРМ	249
France	Франция	FR	FRA	ФРА	250
French Guiana	Гвиана Французская	GF	GUF	ГВИ	254
French Polynesia	Французская Полинезия	PF	PYF	ФРП	258
French Southern Territories	Французские Южные территории	TF	ATF	ФРЮ	260
Djibouti	Джибути	DJ	DJI	ДЖИ	262
Gabon	Габон	GA	GAB	ГАБ	266
Georgia	Грузия	GE	GEO	ГРУ	268
Gambia	Гамбия	GM	GMB	ГАМ	270
Palestinian Territory, Occupied	Палестина	PS	PSE	ПАМ	275
Germany	Германия	DE	DEU	ГЕР	276
Ghana	Гана	GH	GHA	ГАН	288
Gibraltar	Гибралтар	Gl	GIB	ГИБ	292
Kiribati	Кирибати	Kl	KIR	КИР	296
Greece	Греция	GR	GRC	ГРИ	300
Greenland	Гренландия	GL	GRL	ГРЕ	304
Grenada	Гренада	GD	GRD	ГРА	308
Guadeloupe	Гваделупа	GP	GLP	ГВА	312
Guam	Гуам	GU	GUM	ГУА	316
Guatemala	Гватемала	GT	GTM	ГВЕ	320
Guinea	Гвинея	GN	GIN	ГВН	324
Guyana	Гайана	GY	GUY	ГАЙ	328
Haiti	Гаити	HT	HTI	ГАИ	332
Heard Island and McDonald Islands	Херд и Макдональд, острова	HM	HMD	ХЕМ	334
Vatican City State (Holy See)	Ватикан	VA	VAT	ВАТ	336
Honduras	Гондурас	HN	HND	ГОН	340
Hong Kong (Xianggang), Special Administrative Region of China	Гонконг, специальный административный район Китая	HK	HKG	ГОО	344
Hungary	Венгрия	HU	HUN	ВЕН	348
Iceland	Исландия	IS	ISL	ИСЛ	352
India	Индия	IN	IND	ИНД	356
Indonesia	Индонезия	ID	IDN	ИНЗ	360
Iran, Islamic Republic of	Иран	IR	IRN	ИРН	364
Iraq	Ирак	IQ	IRQ	ИРК	368
Ireland	Ирландия	IE	IRL	ИРЯ	372
Israel	Израиль	IL	ISR	ИЗР	376
Italy	Италия	IT	ITA	ИТА	380
Cote d'Ivoire	Кот-д'Ивуар	Cl	CIV	КОТ	384
Jamaica	Ямайка	JM	JAM	ЯМА	388
Japan	Япония	JP	JPN	ЯПО	392
Kazakhstan	Казахстан	KZ	KAZ	КАЗ	398
Jordan	Иордания	JO	JOR	ИОР	400
Kenya	Кения	KE	KEN	КЕН	404
Korea, Democratic People's Republic of	Корейская Народно-Демократическая Республика	KP	PRK	КОП	408
Korea, Republic of	Корея, Республика	KR	KOR	КОР	410
Kuwait	Кувейт	KW	KWT	КУВ	414
Kyrgyzstan	Киргизия (Кыргызстан)	KG	KGZ	КЫР	417
Lao People's Democratic Republic	Лаос	LA	LAO	ЛАО	418
Lebanon	Ливан	LB	LBN	ЛИВ	422
Lesotho	Лесото	LS	LSO	ЛЕС	426
Latvia	Латвия	LV	LVA	ЛАТ	428
Liberia	Либерия	LR	LBR	ЛИБ	430
Libyan Arab Jamahiriya	Ливийская Арабская Джамахирия (Ливия)	LY	LBY	ЛИИ	434
Liechtenstein	Лихтенштейн	LI	LIE	ЛИХ	438
Lithuania	Литва	LT	LTU	ЛИТ	440
Luxembourg	Люксембург	LU	LUX	ЛЮК	442
Macau, Special Administrative Region of China	Аомынь (Макао), специальный административный район Китая	МО	MAC	АОМ	446
Madagascar	Мадагаскар	MG	MDG	МАГ	450
Malawi	Малави	MW	MWI	МАЕ	454
Malaysia	Малайзия	MY	MYS	МАЗ	458
Maldives	Мальдивы	MV	MDV	МАЛ	462
Mali	Мали	ML	MLI	МАИ	466
Malta	Мальта	MT	MLT	МАМ	470
Martinique	Мартиника	MQ	MTQ	MAT	474
Mauritania	Мавритания	MR	MRT	МАВ	478
Mauritius	Маврикий	MU	MUS	МАБ	480
Mexico	Мексика	MX	МЕХ	МЕК	484
Monaco	Монако	MC	MCO	МОН	492
Mongolia	Монголия	MN	MNG	МОО	496
Moldova, Republic of	Молдова (Республика Молдова)	MD	MDA	МОЛ	498
Montserrat	Монтсеррат	MS	MSR	МОТ	500
Morocco	Марокко	MA	MAR	MAP	504
Mozambique	Мозамбик	MZ	MOZ	МОЗ	508
Oman	Оман	OM	OMN	ОМА	512
Namibia	Намибия	NA	NAM	НАМ	516
Nauru	Науру	NR	NRU	НАУ	520
Nepal	Непал	NP	NPL	НЕП	524
Netherlands	Нидерланды	NL	NLU	НИД	528
Netherlands Antilles	Антильские острова (Нидерландские Антилы)	AN	ANT	АНТ	530
Aruba	Аруба	AW	ABW	АРУ	533
New Caledonia	Новая Каледония	NC	NCL	НОК	540
Vanuatu	Вануату	VU	VUT	ВАН	548
New Zealand	Новая Зеландия	NZ	NZL	НОЗ	554
Nicaragua	Никарагуа	NI	NIC	НИК	558
Niger	Нигер	NE	NER	НИА	562
Nigeria	Нигерия	NG	NGA	НИГ	566
Niue	Ниуэ	NU	NIU	НИУ	570
Norfolk Island	Норфолк, остров	NF	NFK	НОФ	574
Norway	Норвегия	NO	NOR	НОР	578
Northern Mariana Islands	Северные Марианские острова	MP	MNP	СЕВ	580
US Minor Outlying Islands	Мелкие отдаленные острова США	UM	UMI	МЕЛ	581
Micronesia, Federated States of	Микронезия (Федеративные Штаты Микронезии)	FM	FSM	МИК	583
Marshall Islands	Маршалловы острова	MH	MHL	МАШ	584
Palau	Палау	PW	PLW	ПАЛ	585
Pakistan	Пакистан	PK	РАК	ПАК	586
Panama	Панама	PA	PAN	ПАН	591
Papua New Guinea	Папуа-Новая Гвинея	PG	PNQ	ПАП	598
Paraguay	Парагвай	PY	PRY	ПАР	600
Peru	Перу	PE	PER	ПЕР	604
Philippines	Филиппины	PH	PHL	ФИЛ	608
Pitcairn	Питкэрн	PN	PCN	ПИТ	612
Poland	Польша	PL	POL	ПОЛ	616
Portugal	Португалия	PT	PRT	ПОР	620
Guinea-Bissau	Гвинея-Бисау	GW	GNB	ГВЯ	624
East Timor	Восточный Тимор	TP	TMP	ВОТ	626
Puerto Rico	Пуэрто-Рико	PR	PRI	ПУЭ	630
Qatar	Катар	QA	QAT	КАТ	634
Reunion	Реюньон	RE	REU	РЕЮ	638
Romania	Румыния	RO	ROM	РУМ	642
Russia (Russian Federation)	Россия (Российская Федерация)	RU	RUS	РОФ	643
Rwanda	Руанда	RW	RWA	РУА	646
Saint Helena	Святая Елена	SH	SHN	СВЯ	654
Saint Kitts and Nevis	Сент-Китс и Невис	KN	KNA	СЕС	659
Anguilla	Ангилья	Al	AIA	AHA	660
Saint Lucia	Сент-Люсия	LC	LCA	СЕТ	662
Saint Pierre and Mequelon	Сен-Пьер и Микелон	PM	SPM	СЕП	666
Saint Vincent and the Grenadines	Сент-Винсент и Гренадины	VC	VCT	СЕР	670
San Marino	Сан-Марино	SM	SMR	САН	674
Sao Tome and Principe	Сан-Томе и Принсипи	ST	STP	CAT	678
Saudi Arabia	Саудовская Аравия	SA	SAU	САУ	682
Senegal	Сенегал	SN	SEN	СЕН	686
Seychelles	Сейшелы	SC	SYC	СЕЙ	690
Sierra Leone	Сьерра-Леоне	SL	SLE	СЬЕ	694
Singapore	Сингапур	SG	SGP	СИН	702
Slovakia	Словакия	SK	SVK	СЛА	703
Viet Nam	Вьетнам	VN	VNM	ВЬЕ	704
Slovenia	Словения	Sl	SVN	СЛО	705
Somalia	Сомали	SO	SOM	СОМ	706
South Africa	Южно-Африканская Республика	ZA	ZAF	ЮЖН	710
Zimbabwe	Зимбабве	ZW	ZWE	ЗИМ	716
Spain	Испания	ES	ESP	ИСП	724
Western Sahara	Западная Сахара	EH	ESH	ЗАП	732
Sudan	Судан	SD	SDN	СУД	736
Suriname	Суринам	SR	SUR	СУР	740
Svalbard and Jan Mayen	Свальбард (Шпицберген) и Ян-Майен	SJ	SJM	СВБ	744
Swaziland	Свазиленд	SZ	SWZ	СВА	748
Sweden	Швеция	SE	SWE	ШВЕ	752
Switzerland	Швейцария	CH	СНЕ	ШВА	756
Syrian Arab Republic	Сирия	SY	SYR	СИР	760
Tajikistan	Таджикистан	TJ	TJK	ТАД	762
Thailand	Таиланд	TH	THA	ТАИ	764
Togo	Того	TG	TGO	ТОГ	768
Tokelau	Токелау	TK	TKL	ТОК	772
Tonga	Тонга	TO	TON	ТОН	776
Trinidad and Tobago	Тринидад и Тобаго	TT	TTO	ТРИ	780
United Arab Emirates	Объединенные Арабские Эмираты	AE	ARE	ОБЭ	784
Tunisia	Тунис	TN	TUN	ТУН	788
Turkey	Турция	TR	TUR	ТУЦ	792
Turkmenistan	Туркменистан	TM	TKM	ТУР	795
Turks and Caicos Islands	Теркс и Кайкос, острова	TC	TCA	ТЕР	796
Tuvalu	Тувалу	TV	TUV	ТУВ	798
Uganda	Уганда	UG	UGA	УГА	800
Ukraine	Украина	UA	UKR	УКР	804
Macedonia	Македония	MK	MKD	МАД	807
Egypt	Египет	EG	EGY	ЕГИ	818
United Kingdom	Великобритания	GB	GBR	ВЕЛ	826
Tanzania, United Republic of	Танзания	TZ	TZA	ТАН	834
United States	Соединенные Штаты Америки (США)	US	USA	СОЕ	840
Virgin Islands (U.S.)	Виргинские острова(США)	VI	VIR	ВИР	850
Burkina Faso	Буркина-Фасо	BF	BFA	БУК	854
Uruguay	Уругвай	UY	URY	УРУ	858
Uzbekistan	Узбекистан	UZ	UZB	УЗБ	860
Venezuela	Венесуэла	VE	VEN	ВЕС	862
Wallis and Futuna Islands	Уоллис и Футуна	WF	WLF	УОЛ	876
Samoa	Самоа	WS	WSM	САМ	882
Yemen	Йемен	YE	YEM	ЙЕМ	887
Yugoslavia	Югославия	YU	YUG	ЮГО	891
Zambia	Замбия	ZM	ZMB	ЗАМ	894

== Regional Codes of Russia as per GOST 7.67-2003 ==
Name (EN)	Name (RU)	CODE (RU)	CODE (EN)	CODE ext.	CODE (NUM)
Moscow	Москва (город)	РОФ-МОС	RU-MOW	RU-MS	643-001
Saint-Petersburg	Санкт-Петербург	РОФ-СПБ	RU-SPB	RU-SP	643-002
Adygeya	Адыгея	РОФ-АДЫ	RU-ADY	RU-AD	643-101
Altai	Алтай	РОФ-АЛР	RU-ALI	RU-AL	643-105
Bashkiriya (Bashkortostan)	Башкирия (Башкортостан)	РОФ-БАШ	RU-BAS	RU-BA	643-109
Buryatia	Бурятия	РОФ-БУР	RU-BUR	RU-BU	643-113
Daghestan	Дагестан	РОФ-ДАГ	RU-DAG	RU-DA	643-117
Ingushetia	Ингушетия	РОФ-ИНГ	RU-ING	RU-IN	643-121
Kabardino-Balkaria	Кабардино-Балкария	РОФ-КАБ	RU-KAB	RU-KB	643-125
Kalmykia	Калмыкия	РОФ-КАИ	RU-KAI	RU-KI	643-129
Karachayevo-Cherkessia	Карачаево-Черкессия	РОФ-КАО	RU-KAO	RU-KK	643-133
Karelia	Карелия	РОФ-КАР	RU-KAR	RU-KL	643-137
Komi	Коми	РОФ-КОМ	RU-KOM	RU-KO	643-141
Marij El	Марий Эл	РОФ-МАР	RU-MAR	RU-ME	643-145
Mordovia	Мордовия	РОФ-МОР	RU-MOR	RU-MO	643-149
North Ossetia (Alania)	Северная Осетия (Алания)	РОФ-СЕВ	RU-NOR	RU-NO	643-153
Tatarstan	Татарстан	РОФ-ТАТ	RU-TAT	RU-TA	643-157
Tuva (Tyva)	Тува (Тыва)	РОФ-ТУВ	RU-TUV	RU-TY	643-161
Udmurtia	Удмуртия	РОФ-УДМ	RU-UDM	RU-UD	643-165
Khakassia	Хакасия	РОФ-ХАК	RU-KHK	RU-KN	643-169
Chechen Republic	Чечня	РОФ-ЧЕЧ	RU-CHA	RU-CE	643-173
Chuvashia	Чувашия	РОФ-ЧУВ	RU-CHV	RU-CU	643-177
Yakutia (Sakha)	Якутия (Саха)	РОФ-ЯКУ	RU-SAH	RU-SA	643-181
Altai kray	Алтайский край	РОФ-АЛТ	RU-ALT		643-301
Amur obl.	Амурская обл.	РОФ-АМУ	RU-AMU		643-308
Arkhangelsck obl.	Архангельская обл.	РОФ-АРХ	RU-ARK		643-314
Astrakhan obl.	Астраханская обл.	РОФ-АСТ	RU-AST		643-320
Belgorod obl.	Белгородская обл.	РОФ-БЕЛ	RU-BEL		643-326
Bryansk obl.	Брянская обл.	РОФ-БРЯ	RU-BRY		643-332
Vladimir obl.	Владимирская обл.	РОФ-ВЛА	RU-VLA		643-338
Volgograd obl.	Волгоградская обл.	РОФ-ВОГ	RU-VGG		643-344
Vologda obl.	Вологодская обл.	РОФ-ВОЛ	RU-VLG		643-350
Voronezh obl.	Воронежская обл.	РОФ-ВОР	RU-VOR		643-356
Ivanovo obl.	Ивановская обл.	РОФ-ИВА	RU-IVA		643-362
Irkutsk obl.	Иркутская обл.	РОФ-ИРК	RU-IRK		643-368
Kaliningrad obl.	Калининградская обл.	РОФ-КАГ	RU-KAG		643-374
Kaluga obl.	Калужская обл.	РОФ-КАЛ	RU-KAL		643-380
Kamchatka obl.	Камчатская обл.	РОФ-КАМ	RU-KAM		643-386
Kemerovo obl.	Кемеровская обл.	РОФ-КЕМ	RU-KEM		643-392
Kirov obl.	Кировская обл.	РОФ-КИР	RU-KIR		643-398
Kostroma obl.	Костромская обл.	РОФ-КОС	RU-KOS		643-404
Krasnodar kray	Краснодарский край	РОФ-КРА	RU-KRA		643-410
Krasnoyarsk kray	Красноярский край	РОФ-КРН	RU-КУА		643-416
Kurgan obl.	Курганская обл.	РОФ-КУР	RU-KUG		643-422
Kursk obl.	Курская обл.	РОФ-КУС	RU-KUR		643-428
Leningrad obl.	Ленинградская обл.	РОФ-ЛЕН	RU-LEN		643-434
Lipetsk obl.	Липецкая обл.	РОФ-ЛИП	RU-LIP		643-440
Magadan obl.	Магаданская обл.	РОФ-МАГ	RU-MAG		643-446
Moscow obl.	Московская обл.	РОФ-МОЯ	RU-MOS		643-452
Murmansk obl.	Мурманская обл.	РОФ-МУР	RU-MUR		643-458
Nizhni Novgorod obl.	Нижегородская обл.	РОФ-НИЖ	RU-NIZ		643-464
Novgorod obl.	Новгородская обл.	РОФ-НОВ	RU-NGR		643-470
Novosibirsk obl.	Новосибирская обл.	РОФ-НОС	RU-NVS		643-476
Omsk obl.	Омская обл.	РОФ-ОМС	RU-OMS		643-484
Orenburg obl.	Оренбургская обл.	РОФ-ОРЕ	RU-ORE		643-490
Oryol obl.	Орловская обл.	РОФ-ОРЛ	RU-ORL		643-496
Penza obl.	Пензенская обл.	РОФ-ПЕН	RU-PNZ		643-504
Perm obl.	Пермская обл.	РОФ-ПЕР	RU-PER		643-510
Primorie kray	Приморский край	РОФ-ПРИ	RU-PRI		643-516
Pskov obl.	Псковская обл.	РОФ-ПСК	RU-PSK		643-522
Rostov obl.	Ростовская обл.	РОФ-РОС	RU-ROS		643-528
Ryazan obl.	Рязанская обл.	РОФ-РЯЗ	RU-RYA		643-534
Samara obl.	Самарская обл.	РОФ-САМ	RU-SAM		643-540
Saratov obl.	Саратовская обл.	РОФ-САР	RU-SAR		643-546
Sakhalin obl.	Сахалинская обл.	РОФ-САХ	RU-SAK		643-552
Sverdlovsk obl.	Свердловская обл.	РОФ-СВЕ	RU-SVE		643-558
Smolensk obl.	Смоленская обл.	РОФ-СМО	RU-SMO		643-564
Stavropol kray	Ставропольский край	РОФ-СТА	RU-STA		643-570
Tambov obl.	Тамбовская обл.	РОФ-ТАМ	RU-TAM		643-576
Tver obl.	Тверская обл.	РОФ-ТВЕ	RU-TVE		643-582
Tomsk obl.	Томская обл.	РОФ-ТОМ	RU-TOM		643-588
Tula obl.	Тульская обл.	РОФ-ТУЛ	RU-TUL		643-594
Tyumen obl.	Тюменская обл.	РОФ-ТЮМ	RU-TYU		643-600
Ulyanovsk obl.	Ульяновская обл.	РОФ-УЛЬ	RU-ULY		643-606
Khabarovsk kray	Хабаровский край	РОФ-ХАБ	RU-KHA		643-612
Chelyabinsk obl.	Челябинская обл.	РОФ-ЧЕЛ	RU-CHE		643-618
Chita obl.	Читинская обл.	РОФ-ЧИТ	RU-CHI		643-624
Yaroslavl obl.	Ярославская обл.	РОФ-ЯРО	RU-YAR		643-630
Jewish a.o.	Еврейская а.о.	РОФ-ЕВР	RU-JEW		643-701
Aginsk Buryat aut.okr.	Агинский Бурятский авт. окр.	РОФ-АГИ	RU-AGB		643-712
Komi-Permyatski aut. okr.	Коми-Пермяцкий авт.окр.	РОФ-КОП	RU-KOP		643-718
Koryak aut. okr.	Корякский авт.окр.	РОФ-КОР	RU-KOR		643-724
Nenets aut. okr.	Ненецкий авт.окр.	РОФ-НЕН	RU-NEN		643-730
Taimyr (Dolgano-Nenets) aut. okr.	Таймырский (Долгано-Ненецкий) авт.окр.	РОФ-ТАЙ	RU-TAY		643-736
Ust-Ordyn Buryat aut. okr.	Усть-Ордынский Бурятский авт.окр.	РОФ-УСТ	RU-UOB		643-742
Khanty-Mansijsk aut. okr.	Ханты-Мансийский авт.окр.	РОФ-ХАН	RU-KHM		643-748
Chukotka aut. okr.	Чукотский авт.окр.	РОФ-ЧУК	RU-CHU		643-754
Evenk aut. okr.	Эвенкийский авт.окр.	РОФ-ЭВЕ	RU-EVE		643-760
Yamalo-Nenets aut. okr.	Ямало-Ненецкий авт.окр.	РОФ-ЯМА	RU-YAN		643-766

Two-letter regional codes are available only for Moscow, Saint-Petersburg and federal subjects with republican status.

== Sources ==
- Коды названий стран, at the official website of the TGTU.
