= Rodney Ledward =

English obstetrician and gynaecologist (1938–2000)

- Born: Rodney Spencer Ledward; 1 January 1938; Stone, Staffordshire, England
- Died: 25 October 2000 (aged 62)
- Occupation: Gynaecologist
- Spouse: Lady Jane Annabelle Howard (m. 1983)
- Children: 1

Rodney Spencer Ledward (January 1938 – 25 October 2000) was an English obstetrician and gynaecologist. He was accused of injuring women under his care, which he denied. In 1998 he was struck off the medical register after being found guilty by the General Medical Council for serious professional misconduct relating to 13 incompetently performed operations at William Harvey Hospital in Ashford and the private St Saviour's Hospital in Hythe between 1989 and 1996.

R.S. Ledward died in 2000 from pancreatic cancer.

== Early life and career ==
Rodney Spencer Ledward was born in Stone, Staffordshire. He first trained as a pharmaceutical chemist at the University of Manchester. Later he became a surgeon who specialized in obstetrics and gynecology. He became an acclaimed senior NHS consultant obstetrician and gynaecologist at the William Harvey Hospital in Ashford, Kent in 1980, and practiced at multiple private hospitals in the South East of England.

In 1983 he married the Hon. Lady Jane Annabelle Howard, the daughter of the 12th Earl of Carlisle. They had one child together.

R.S. Ledward studied medicine at University of Liverpool and obtained a doctorate from the University of Nottingham.

In addition to his clinical career he was also academically active. He served as a visiting faculty member at Rutgers University and was appointed as an honorary senior teaching fellow at the Royal London Hospital Medical College which later became integrated in the Barts and The London School of Medicine and Dentistry. He published articles and textbooks especially around pharmacotherapy in obstetrics. He was involved in the training of medical students, house officers and registrars in the UK and also served as supervisor in the training of Belgian (Ghent University) medical students rotating at the William Harvey Hospital. After being struck off the medical register, the pharmaceutical society also struck him off as a pharmacist. He then retreated to his stud farm in Cork, Ireland.
