= Semiprofession =

Skilled occupation short of profession

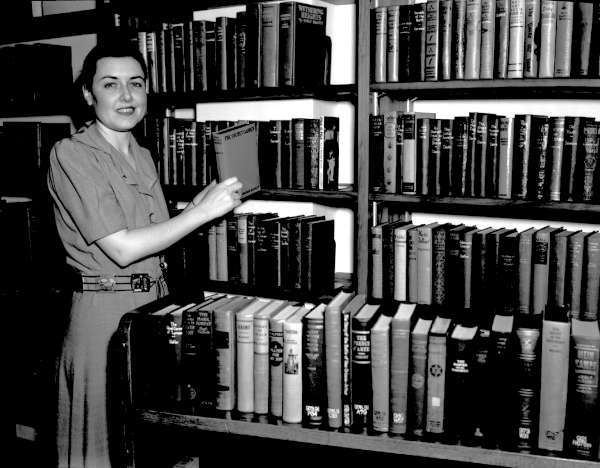
Librarianship is one of the traditional semiprofessions.

A semiprofession is an occupation that requires advanced knowledge and skills but is not widely regarded as a true profession. Traditional examples of semiprofessions include social work, journalism, librarianship, teaching and nursing. Such fields often have less clear-cut barriers to entry than traditional professions like law and medicine, and their practitioners often lack the degree of control over their own work that has been traditionally associated with professionals such as doctors and lawyers.

In addition, semiprofessions tend to have been historically identified as "women's work," which has exacerbated prejudices against regarding them as "true" professions regardless of the amount of skill involved.

In most semiprofessional fields, efforts at professionalization are ongoing.

The question of whether nursing is properly considered a semiprofession in the present day is hotly debated. Arguments in favor of continuing to regard nursing as a semiprofession have included the toleration of part-time work and nursing's traditional subordination to medicine in making treatment decisions. Arguments in favor of regarding nursing as a profession, rather than a semiprofession, include the extensive postsecondary training requirements, formal certification as a registered nurse, self-regulation, and the existence of formal codes of professional ethics.

== AACTE list ==
One group especially tied to this term, the American Association of Colleges for Teacher Education (AACTE), published a list of twelve checkpoints they believe help define a semiprofession.

1. Lower in occupational status
2. Shorter training periods
3. Lack of societal acceptance that the nature of the service and/or the level of expertise justifies the autonomy that is granted to the professions
4. A less specialized and less highly developed body of knowledge and skills
5. Markedly less emphasis on theoretical and conceptual bases for practice
6. A tendency for the individual to identify with the employment institution more and with the profession less
7. More subject to administrative and supervisory surveillance and control
8. Less autonomy in professional decision making, with accountability to superiors rather than to the profession
9. Management by persons who have themselves been prepared and served in that semiprofession
10. A preponderance of women
11. Absence of the right of privileged communication between client and professional
12. Little or no involvement in matters of life and death

== Works cited ==
- Arfken, Deborah Elwell (1998). "Semiprofessions". In Linda Eisenmann (ed.). Historical Dictionary of Women's Education in the United States. pp. 358–359.

== See also ==
- Paraprofessional
