= Credentialism and degree inflation =

More higher education reduces its value

Credentialism and degree inflation are processes that result in an inflation of demand for educational qualifications, and the devaluation of these educational qualifications.

Credentialism or professionalization is the growing protection of professions in modern societies by demanding formal qualifications or certifications.

Degree inflation, also called credential inflation, academic inflation, and credential creep, is the devaluation of educational or academic credentials over time, and a corresponding decrease in the expected advantage given a degree holder in the job market, due to an excess of higher educated people who compete for too few jobs that require these degrees. It has also led to grade inflation, a trend to award higher grades for accomplishment of the same quality.

== Credentialism and professionalization ==
Credentialism is a reliance on formal qualifications or certifications to determine whether someone is permitted to undertake a task, speak as an "expert" or work in a certain field. It has also been defined as "excessive reliance on credentials, especially academic degrees, in determining hiring or promotion policies."

Professionalization is the social process by which any trade or occupation is transformed into a true "profession of the highest integrity and competence". This process tends to involve establishing acceptable qualifications, a professional body or association to oversee the conduct of members of the profession and some degree of demarcation of the qualified from unqualified amateurs. This creates "a hierarchical divide between the knowledge-authorities in the professions and a deferential citizenry." This demarcation is often termed "occupational closure", as it means that the profession then becomes closed to entry from outsiders, amateurs and the unqualified: a stratified occupation "defined by professional demarcation and grade".

The institutionalizing of professional education has resulted in fewer and fewer opportunities for young people to work their way up by "learning on the job". Academic inflation leads employers to put more faith into certificates and diplomas awarded on the basis of other people's assessments.

=== Causes ===
==== Knowledge economy ====
The developed world has transitioned from an agricultural economy (pre-1760s) to an industrial economy (1760s – 1900s) to a knowledge economy (late 1900s – present) due to increases in innovation. This latest stage is marked by technological advancement and global competition to produce new products and research. The shift to a knowledge economy, a term coined by Peter Drucker, has led to a decrease in the demand for physical labor (such as that seen during the Industrial Age) and an increase in the demand for intellect. This has caused a multitude of problems to arise. Economists from the Federal Reserve Bank of St. Louis, who categorized jobs as being either routine cognitive, routine manual, nonroutine cognitive or nonroutine manual, have examined a 30 million increase in the number of nonroutine cognitive jobs over the past 30 years, making it the most common job type. These nonroutine cognitive jobs, according to researchers, require "high intellectual skill". This can be rather difficult to measure in potential employees. Additionally, production outputs differ amongst labor types. The results of manual labor are tangible, whereas the results of knowledge labor are not. Management consultant Fred Nickols identifies an issue with this:

The working behaviors of the manual worker are public and those of the knowledge worker are private. From the perspective of a supervisor or an industrial engineer, this means the visibility of working is high for a manual worker and low for a knowledge worker.

Decreased visibility in the workplace correlates with a greater risk of employees underperforming in cognitive tasks. This, along with the previously mentioned issue of measuring cognitive skill, has resulted in employers requiring credentials, such as college degrees. Matt Sigelman, CEO of a labor market analysis firm, elaborates on why employers such as himself value degrees:

Many employers are using the bachelor's degree as a proxy for quality employees—a rough, rule-of-thumb screening mechanism to sort through the resume pile. Employers believe in the college experience, not just as an incubator for job-specific skills but particularly for the so-called soft skills, such as writing, analytical thinking and even maturity.

==== History ====
Western culture, specifically that in the United States, has experienced a rise in the attractiveness of professions and a decline in the attractiveness of manufacturing and independent business. This shift could be attributed to the class stratification that occurred during the Gilded Age.

The Gilded Age was a period of time marked by a rise in big businesses and globalization, particularly within the construction and oil industries. During the Long Depression, the monopoly trusts dispossessed family and subsistence farmers of their land. This combined with the mechanization of farm work led to mass proletarianization, employers or the self-employed becoming wage laborers, as individuals took jobs working on large projects such as the Transcontinental Railroad. Rapid advancements such as railroad developments and increased use of steamboats to import/export goods made cities such as New York and Chicago convenient places to operate a business, and therefore ideal places to find work. Local business owners had a difficult time competing with the large companies such as Standard Oil and Armour and Company operating out of cities. The ability for people to become entrepreneurs declined, and people began taking underpaying jobs at these companies. This fueled a class divide between the working class and industrialists (also called "robber barons") such as Andrew Carnegie and John Rockefeller.

Attempting to increase the prestige of one's occupation became standard among working class individuals trying to recover from the financial hardships of this time. Unqualified individuals turned to professions such as medicine and law, which had low barriers to entry. Referring to this phenomenon, historian Robert Huddleston Wiebe once commented:

The concept of a middle class crumbled to a touch. Small businesses appeared and disappeared at a frightening rate. The so-called professions meant little as long as anyone with a bag of pills and a bottle of syrup could pass for a doctor, a few books and a corrupt judge made a man a lawyer, and an unemployed literate qualified as a teacher. Nor did the growing number of clerks, salesman, and secretaries of the city share much more than a common sense of drift as they fell into jobs that attached them to nothing in particular, beyond a salary, a set of clean clothes, and a hope that they would somehow rise in the world.

The establishment of legitimized professional certifications began after the turn of the twentieth century when the Carnegie Foundation published reports on medical and law education. One example of such reports is the Flexner Report, written by educator Abraham Flexner. This research led to the closing of low-quality medical and law schools. The impact of the many unqualified workers of the Gilded age also increased motivation to weed out unqualified workers in other professions. Professionalization increased, and the number of professions and professionals multiplied. There were economic benefits to this because it lowered the competition for jobs by weeding out unqualified candidates, driving up salaries.

The alliance of employers with educational institutions progressed throughout the twentieth century as businesses and technological advancements progressed. Businessmen were unable to keep schedules or accounts in their heads like the small-town merchant had once done. New systems of accounting, organization, and business management were developed. In his book The Visible Hand, Alfred Chandler of Harvard Business School explained that the increase in large corporations with multiple divisions killed off the hybrid owner/managers of simpler times and created a demand for salaried, "scientific" management. The development of professional management societies, research groups, and university business programs began in the early 1900s. By 1910, Harvard and Dartmouth offered graduate business programs, and NYU, the University of Chicago, and the University of Pennsylvania offered undergraduate business programs. By the 1960s, nearly half of all managerial jobs formally required either an undergraduate or graduate degree.

== Credential inflation or degree inflation ==
Credential inflation, also called academic inflation, refers to the devaluation of educational or academic credentials over time and a corresponding decrease in the expected advantage given a degree holder in the job market, due to an excess of higher educated people who compete for too few jobs that require these degrees. Credential inflation is thus similar to price inflation, and describes the declining value of earned certificates and degrees. Credential inflation in the form of increased educational requirements and testing, can also create artificial labor shortages.

Credential inflation has been recognized as an enduring trend over the past century in Western higher education, and is also known to have occurred in ancient China and Japan, and at Spanish universities of the 17th century.

The term "academic inflation" was popularized by Ken Robinson in his TED Talk entitled "Schools Kill Creativity". It has been analogized to the inflation of paper currencies where too much currency chases too few commodities.

=== Examples ===
For instance, in the late 1980s, a bachelor's degree was the standard qualification to enter the profession of physical therapy. By the 1990s, a master's degree was expected. Today, a doctorate is becoming the norm.

State requirements that registered nurses must hold bachelor's degrees have also contributed to a nursing shortage.

Despite the official U.S. unemployment rate staying at a low 4.3 percent through May 2026, many job seekers with advanced degrees are still reportedly having a hard time finding jobs. Years of declining job openings and tougher competition are behind this. The situation has been made even worse by major workforce cuts in sectors like the federal government, which have only added more candidates to an already crowded field.

=== Indications ===
A good example of credential inflation is the decline in the value of the US high school diploma since the beginning of the 20th century, when it was held by less than 10 percent of the population. At the time, high school diplomas attested to middle-class respectability and for many years even provided access to managerial level jobs. In the 21st century, however, a high school diploma often barely qualifies the graduate for menial service work.

One indicator of credential inflation is the relative decline in the wage differential between those with college degrees and those with only high school diplomas. An additional indicator is the gap between the credentials requested by employers in job postings and the qualifications of those already in those occupations. A 2014 study in the United States found, for example, that 65% of job postings for executive secretaries and executive assistants now call for a bachelor's degree, but only 19% of those currently employed in these roles have a degree. Jobs that were open to high school graduates decades ago now routinely require higher education as well—without an appreciable change in required skills. In some cases, such as IT help desk roles, a study found there was little difference in advertised skill requirements between jobs requiring a college degree and those that do not.

According to the New York Federal Reserve Bank, about one third of all college graduates are underemployed, meaning they are employed below the value of their degrees. That distribution has remained largely unchanged for thirty years, although the chance of being underemployed in a good job has gone down 28.0% for recent hirings, and 20.6% overall.

=== Causes ===
The causes of credential inflation are controversial, but it is generally thought to be the result of increased access to higher education. This has resulted in entry-level jobs requesting a bachelor's (or higher) degree when they were once open to high school graduates. Potential sources of credential inflation include: degree requirements by employers, self-interest of individuals and families, increased standards of living which allow for additional years of education, cultural pushes for being educated, and the availability of federal student loans which allow many more individuals to obtain credentials than could otherwise afford to do so.

In particular, the internal dynamics of credential inflation threaten higher education initiatives around the world because credential inflation appears to operate independently of market demand for credentials.

The push for more Americans to get a higher education rests on the well-evidenced idea that those without a college degree are less employable. Many critics of higher education, in turn, complain that a surplus of college graduates has produced an "employer's market". Economist Bryan Caplan has argued the combination of more college graduates and weaker learning outcomes has led to employers asking for college degrees for jobs that do not need one and previously did not require one.

=== Problems ===
Credential inflation is a controversial topic. There is very little consensus on how, or if, this type of inflation impacts higher education, the job market, and salaries. Some common concerns discussed in this topic are:

- The proliferation of a grandiose and superficial culture has engendered a paradoxical phenomenon within China's employment landscape, particularly evident in the disproportionate educational requirements for roles traditionally devoid of such stipulations. Previously, there were no academic qualifications required for security guard positions. However, it has come to light that some employers are now demanding that applicants for such roles possess a master's degree or higher. And in fact, many jobs do not require formal education and can be adequately performed after on-the-job training or apprenticeships and those applicants who meet the educational requirements and are hired by employers often find that the subject of their diploma does not align with the work they are doing. They have to start from scratch in their jobs, causing a waste of educational resources.
- College tuition and fee increases have been blamed on degree inflation, though the current data does not generally support this assertion.
- Age discrimination is prevalent in China's workplace. In government agencies, public institutions, and enterprises, employees over the age of 34 face a higher probability of layoffs and greater workplace pressure. The job market has established a "35-year-old threshold," rejecting applicants over the age of 34. Meanwhile, by the time one completes a doctoral degree, they are already approaching 35 and, having entered the workforce late, lack sufficient social experience. As a result, once these doctoral degree holders leave their jobs or temporarily fail to find suitable employment, they are unwilling to take on low-end work. Compounded by the rise of AI, which has replaced many jobs, they find it extremely difficult to secure a suitable position by the age of 35.
- Credential-driven students may be less engaged than those who are attending college for personal enrichment.
- Credentialism is prevalent in China, where children from impoverished families pursue higher education but cannot afford the associated costs. They are often forced to attend public schools or non-profit charitable universities, which have lower tuition than private institutions, yet even these fees remain a heavy burden. To pay for tuition, they economize on living expenses to the extreme. This situation, coupled with education inflation leading to the rapid devaluation of university degrees, means that when these graduates enter the job market, their employment prospects are often worse than anticipated. Since the tuition paid consumed a large portion of their poor families' expenditure, this disproportionate return on investment leads to feelings of disappointment and dissatisfaction among the children from these families. On the other hand, education inflation has led to many people holding a bachelor's degree or higher, and these highly educated individuals often have high expectations when job searching, believing they can secure high-paying positions commensurate with their academic qualifications. However, in reality, the professional skills of many graduates are misaligned with market demands; the market under-demands certain skills while certain specializations suffer from oversupply. Consequently, they are forced to accept jobs that are either mismatched with their majors or low-end positions for which they are overqualified. This mismatch of education to job results in a severe misallocation of human resources, and low-end employment leads to a waste of social resources. Furthermore, the vast gap between their ideals and reality forces these highly educated individuals to endure the heavy toll of mental exhaustion and low spirits over the long term.
- Devaluation of other forms of learning.In China, the overemphasis on formal academic education and the supremacy of diplomas have led to the decline of the apprenticeship system, which in turn has triggered a severe shortage of skilled workers. Apprenticeship once offered a valuable "learn-by-doing" pathway, enabling young people to establish themselves in society at an early age. Today, however, everyone rushes toward universities. Compared to the low burden of apprenticeships—where one earns while learning—the high cost and lengthy duration of university education significantly increase personal investment. More crucially, the apprenticeship model significantly reduces trial-and-error costs while affording individuals exceptional flexibility: if one finds the current work ill-suited, transitioning to a new trade is both swift and efficient. By contrast, as the environment shifts, many majors that were hot upon enrollment turn cold by graduation. Apprenticeship thus offers a far more pragmatic and economical hedging path than "going back to university for a complete restart. Genuine craft innovation often stems from deep hands-on expertise. When the solid foundational training that lies at the core of apprenticeship is weakened, craftsmen's profound understanding of materials, tools, and processes becomes superficial. In the long run, this may erode a nation's craftsmanship precision and innovative capacity.
- Before educational inflation, the diploma gap was not significant, and employers did not have high diploma requirements for job applicants. After educational inflation, people's educational qualifications became uneven, and employers raised the diploma requirements for recruitment. Those who could not meet the diploma threshold for recruitment had to resort to joining the underworld out of desperation to make a living, while women were forced to become hostesses or sex workers – jobs that do not require diplomas. Moreover, not all individuals lacking the relevant diplomas are poor students. Some students who excel in specific areas may struggle with the comprehensive general education requirements, preventing them from obtaining the necessary diplomas.
- Opportunity costs of attending graduate school, which can include delayed savings, fewer years in work force (and less earnings), and postponement of starting families.
- Educational inflation has made mate selection difficult for women, who prefer partners with equal or higher education. In China, for example, mate selection was relatively easier for women before educational inflation because educational disparities were smaller. However, after educational inflation, the gap in academic qualifications has widened, the length of education has increased, and the time to enter the workforce has been delayed; in addition, women are unwilling to marry men with lower educational qualifications than themselves, leading to a significant increase in the number of single women in China. Even if a man is exceptionally talented, a mere lack of sufficient educational credentials is enough to deter women from even wanting to get to know him.
- Lack of adequately trained faculty and rises in the number of adjunct professors which can adversely impact quality of education.
- Grade inflation has been correlated to degree inflation by some academics, though the causal direction is debated.
- Some have accused degree inflation of devaluing job and employment experience, though most data show that degrees are not as highly sought after as relevant experience, which is the cited reason for student loan debt that cannot be paid back.
- Some in-service employees or government officials in China, despite being experienced in their work, are forced to pursue higher education, such as associate degree to bachelor's degree, master's or doctoral degrees, due to the lack of high educational requirements when they were first hired. This diverts their energy from work, and sometimes the field of study is not relevant to their job. As a result, obtaining a degree does not necessarily improve their work abilities
- Although honorary doctorates are intended to honor individuals for their exceptional contributions or social influence in a specific field, and do not require coursework, exams, or thesis defenses, the proliferation of regular doctoral degrees has diluted the prestige of honorary doctorates
- In April 2025, Peking Union Medical College in China was exposed by the media to have launched a clinical medicine doctoral training program in 2018 known as the "4+4" model, which consists of 4 years of non-medical undergraduate education followed by 4 years of medical professional education. The program uses the theory of liberal education as a justification, arguing that doctors should possess a broader knowledge base beyond medicine. This has sparked a debate between liberal education and specialized education. The public has expressed disapproval, claiming that it not only wastes the first four years of undergraduate study but also results in doctors trained under the liberal education theory lacking adequate medical skills. Furthermore, the program has been criticized as a shortcut for children of powerful and wealthy families to quickly obtain a doctoral degree.

== Grade inflation ==
Grade inflation is the tendency to award progressively higher academic grades for work that would have received lower grades in the past. It is frequently discussed in relation to education in the United States, and to GCSEs and A levels in England and Wales. It is also discussed as an issue in Canada and many other nations, especially Australia and New Zealand.

== In non-US countries ==
=== China ===
Chinese educational competition is described as breakneck and cut-throat. The word “neijuan” or “involution” has been used to describe people competing for diminishing returns. China is a country exhibiting high wealth inequality and meager social mobility, raising the stakes to get into the few available managerial positions. The entrenched high-stakes testing culture coupled with inconsistent governance has led to unusually high levels of cheating among the fuerdai (China's second-generation rich). The practice includes whole cheating rings and persists despite extreme penalties, as high as seven years in prison. To combat this self-defeating testing culture, the Chinese government has banned cram schools and for-profit tutoring businesses, as well as tutoring on the weekends. “Tang ping” or “lying flat” refers to a peaceful Chinese protest movement calling attention to the desire not to be burned up in an economic race that so many cannot seem to win.

=== South Korea ===
South Korea has a very high-pressure education system. 70% of South Koreans have postsecondary diplomas and South Koreans score at or near the top when compared to other countries, but are left to fight for few jobs in a high-maintenance economy. Aside from having to work very hard, they also face an immense housing crisis. In 2021, suicide was the leading cause of death for those under 40, responsible for 44% of teenage deaths, which went up to 56.8% of deaths for those in their 20's. Among OECD nations, South Korea has the highest suicide rate. Only 23.6% of teachers expressed satisfaction with their work in a 2023 poll. The country has also suffered from cripplingly low birth-rates, less than one per female, a testament to the strain that would-be parents endure.

== India ==
In the South Asian higher education context, the co-movement of accelerating tuition fees and structural credential devaluation has been formalized as the Double Inflation Principle. Recent panel analysis tracks an asymmetric positional arms race where whole-programme tuition outpaces median corporate entry wages, driving cohort migration toward premium signaling tiers.

== See also ==
- Diploma mill
- Elite overproduction
- Higher education bubble in the United States
- Overqualification
- Positional good
