= State quality mark of the USSR =

Certification mark

- Certifying agency: State Attestation Commission (Russian: Государственная аттестационная комиссия, Gosudarstvennaya attestatsionnaya komissiya)
- Effective region: USSR
- Effective since: 1967
- Defunct: 1992
- Predecessor: None
- Successor: Rostest mark
- Product category: Various
- Legal status: Advisory

The State quality mark of the USSR (Russian: Государственный знак качества СССР, transliteration Gosudarstvennyi znak kachestva SSSR) was the official Soviet mark for the certification of quality established in 1967.

== Symbol ==
Quality mark of the USSR with the dimensions and angles

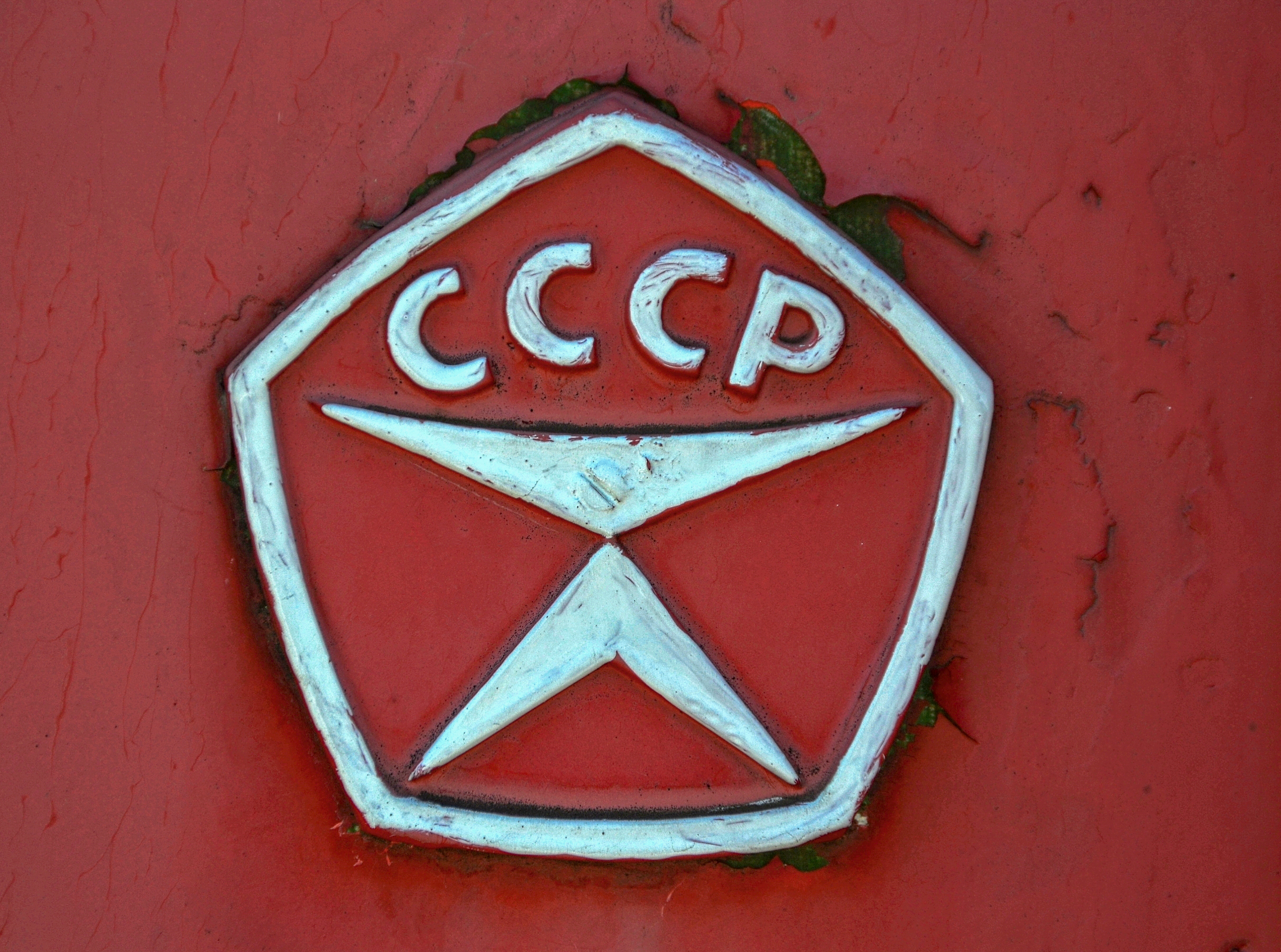
An example of the use: the state quality mark placed on the front of an AA-60 fire engine

The sign was a pentagonal shield with a rotated letter K (from Russian word Kachestvo – quality) stylized as scales below the Cyrillic abbreviation for USSR (Russian: СССР, SSSR).

== History ==
It was used to mark consumer, production, and technical goods to certify that they met quality standards and, in general, to increase the effectiveness of the production system in the USSR.

The goods themselves or their packaging were marked, as was the accompanying documentation, labels or tags. Rules of its use were defined by GOST, an acronym for "state standard" (gosudarstvennyy standart), section 1.9-67 (7 April 1967).

The right to use the sign was leased to the enterprises for 2–3 years based on the examination of the goods by the State Attestation Commission (Russian: Государственная Атестационная Комиссия, Gosudarstvennaya Atestatsionnaya Komissiya) that should certify that the goods are of the "higher quality category". That is:

- their quality "meets or exceeds the quality of the best international analogs",
- parameters of quality are stable,
- goods fully satisfy Soviet state standards,
- goods are compatible with international standards,
- production of goods is economically effective, and
- they satisfy the demands of the state economy and the population.

Obtaining the sign allowed the enterprises to increase the state controlled price for the goods by ten percent. When the sign was introduced it indeed suggested high quality of the goods but after some time a lot of Soviet-made goods were certified for the sign while their quality often remained below expectations of customers.

After the dissolution of the Soviet Union, the Russian government introduced its own sign for certification of quality, known as the Rostest mark (or R mark).

== See also ==
- Certification mark
- State Emblem of the Soviet Union
- Rostest – organization responsible for the newer Rostest mark
