= Issues in higher education in the United States =

Issues in higher education

Higher education in the United States is an optional stage of formal learning following secondary education. Higher education, also referred to as post-secondary education, third-stage, third-level, or tertiary education occurs most commonly at one of the 3,899 Title IV degree-granting institutions in the country. These may be public universities, private universities, liberal arts colleges, community colleges, or for-profit colleges. Learning environments vary greatly depending on not only the type of institution, but also the different goals implemented by the relevant county and state.

U.S. higher education is loosely regulated by the government and several third-party organizations. Persistent social problems such as discrimination and poverty, which stem from the history of the U.S., have significantly impacted trends in American higher education over several decades. Both de facto and de jure discrimination have impacted communities' access to higher education based on race, class, ethnicity, gender identity, religion, sexual orientation, and other factors. Access to higher education has been characterized by some as a rite of passage and the key to the American Dream.

Higher education presents a wide range of issues for government officials, educational staff, and students. Financial difficulties in continuing and expanding access as well as affirmative action programs have been the subject of growing debate.

== Educational pipeline ==
U.S. college students come from three major sources: the U.S. K-12 pipeline, adult or non-traditional students, and international students. Projections about future enrollment patterns are based on demographic projections about these groups.

=== K–12 education ===
As of 2022, the U.S. ranks second to last among OECD nations in terms of both poverty gap and poverty rate. Jonathan Kozol has described these inequalities in K-12 education in Savage Inequalities and The Shame of the Nation: The Restoration of Apartheid Schooling in America.

In a 1998 Brookings Institution paper "Unequal Opportunity: Race and Education," Linda Darling-Hammond stated that "educational outcomes for minority children are much more a function of their unequal access to key educational resources, including skilled teachers and quality curriculum, than they are a function of race." In 2016, the American Psychological Society added that racial bias by teachers and administrators is also a factor in student outcomes. This affects how teachers teach and administrators discipline students. Sociologists have studied disciplining practices in U.S. schools and disparities between racial groups as part of the school-to-prison pipeline.

More than half of U.S. students go to "racially concentrated" schools. Twenty percent of U.S. students are enrolled in districts that are poor and nonwhite, but only 5 percent live in poor white districts. The number of school districts in the United States has been increasing, reflecting a growing race and social class divide.

About a half a million high schools students are not prepared for college when they enroll and require remedial education.

=== Adult or nontraditional students ===
Adult or nontraditional students are those that do not matriculate immediately after high school graduation. This includes military veterans that use the GI Bill. The National Center for Education Statistics (NCES) defines nontraditional students as anyone who satisfies at least one of the following:

- Delays enrollment (does not enter postsecondary education in the same calendar year as finishing high school)
- Attends part-time for at least part of the academic year
- Works full-time (35 hours or more per week) while enrolled
- Is considered financially independent for purposes of determining eligibility for financial aid
- Has dependents other than a spouse (usually children, but may also be caregivers of sick or elderly family members)
- Is a single parent (either not married or married but separated and has dependents)
- Does not have a high school diploma (completed high school with a GED or other high school completion certificate or did not finish high school)

=== International students ===
International students have been a growing part of U.S. higher education. However, competition from other countries, changing immigration policies, and tensions between faculty and students have reduced the appeal for studying in the U.S.

== Choosing a college or university ==
Those who attend U.S. colleges and universities choose particular institutions based on several factors, including price, prestige and selectivity of the school, course offerings and college majors, location, campus culture, and job opportunities following graduation.

High school students aspiring to be selected to the best colleges start the college-choice process earlier and make decisions earlier. Financial aid is an important factor in students' college choice process. Rising college prices and the increased need to rely on loans constrain the college choice process for low-income students.

Latinos are more likely than white or African-American students to begin postsecondary study at community colleges than at four-year institutions. As a result of these decisions, Latinos are "converting existing colleges and institutions into HSIs (Historically Serving Institutions)."

African-Americans have chosen historically black colleges and universities (HBCUs) because of geography, religion, the college's academic reputation, and relatives' desires. The top three reasons for choosing predominantly white institutions has been athletic recruitment, proximity, and the college's academic reputation.

=== College preparedness and remediation ===
According to the Hechinger Report, public colleges report enrolling more than half a million of students who are unprepared for college. Most schools place students in remedial math or English courses before they can take a full load of college-level, credit-bearing courses. This remediation costs an estimated $7 billion a year.

=== Rankings of tertiary institutions ===
Universitas 21 ranked the country as having the best higher education system in the world in 2012. Cost was not considered in the rankings. Numerous organizations produce rankings of universities in the United States each year. A 2010 University of Michigan study has confirmed that the rankings in the United States have significantly affected colleges' applications and admissions. Referred to as the "granddaddy of the college rankings", America's best-known American college and university rankings have been compiled since 1983 by U.S. News & World Report and are widely regarded as the most influential of all college rankings. However, the top schools on the U.S. News & World Report Best Colleges Ranking tend to be prestigious research universities whose undergraduates have been shown to underperform the undergraduates of small liberal arts colleges on the Medical College Admission Test, as well as fewer going on to receive PhDs.

=== Criticism of college and university rankings ===
On June 19, 2007, during the annual meeting of the Annapolis Group, members discussed the letter to college presidents asking them not to participate in the "reputation survey" section of the U.S. News & World Report survey (this section comprises 25 percent of the ranking). As a result, "a majority of the approximately 80 presidents at the meeting said that they did not intend to participate in the U.S. News reputational rankings in the future." However, the decision to fill out the reputational survey or not will be left up to each individual college as: "the Annapolis Group is not a legislative body and any decision about participating in the US News rankings rests with the individual institutions." The statement also said that its members "have agreed to participate in the development of an alternative common format that presents information about their colleges for students and their families to use in the college search process." This database will be web-based and developed in conjunction with higher education organizations including the National Association of Independent Colleges and Universities and the Council of Independent Colleges.

On June 22, 2007, U.S. News & World Report editor Robert Morse issued a response in which he argued, "in terms of the peer assessment survey, we at U.S. News firmly believe the survey has significant value because it allows us to measure the "intangibles" of a college that we can't measure through statistical data. Plus, the reputation of a school can help get that all-important first job and plays a key part in which grad school someone will be able to get into. The peer survey is by nature subjective, but the technique of asking industry leaders to rate their competitors is a commonly accepted practice. The results from the peer survey also can act to level the playing field between private and public colleges." In reference to the alternative database discussed by the Annapolis Group, Morse also argued, "It's important to point out that the Annapolis Group's stated goal of presenting college data in a common format has been tried before [...] U.S. News has been supplying this exact college information for many years already. And it appears that NAICU will be doing it with significantly less comparability and functionality. U.S. News first collects all these data (using an agreed-upon set of definitions from the Common Data Set). Then we post the data on our website in easily accessible, comparable tables. In other words, the Annapolis Group and the others in the NAICU initiative actually are following the lead of U.S. News."

=== Admissions data disclosure ===
Colleges report admissions data to the federal government each year, and many also publish it in the Common Data Set, but these figures become available months after admission decisions are released. In August 2018, Stanford University announced that it would no longer publicize undergraduate application numbers during the admission cycle, in an effort to reduce the focus on low acceptance rates. In 2022, the University of Pennsylvania, Cornell University and Princeton University did not release admissions data on the day their decisions were sent. In December 2025, Dartmouth College declined for a second year to release its early decision application and acceptance figures, saying the numbers could discourage regular decision applicants.

== Cost and financing issues and financial value of degrees ==
Higher education plays a vital part of the American Dream for many students. Going to college and earning a degree has been vouched as an investment that leads to a career or position that will allow a college graduate to be compensated with a higher wage compared to the wage of someone without a degree. However, many acquire student loan debts whether you graduate or not if you don't have a full ride to attend at little or no cost. According to the Center for American Progress (CAP), there are many factors that contribute to the rise in the student loan crisis, but borrower find that repaying their loans whether federal or private can be challenging.

=== Statistics ===
In 2019, the Federal Reserve Bank of St. Louis published research (using data from the 2016 Survey of Consumer Finances) demonstrating that large and increasing income and wealth premiums for families with heads of household with post-secondary education as compared to those without in aggregate data are misleading. After controlling for race and age cohort, the income premium for families with heads of household with post-secondary education has remained positive but has declined to historic lows for families with heads of household born since 1980 (with more pronounced downward trajectories with heads of household with post-graduate degrees), while wealth premiums for the 1980s cohort has weakened to the point of statistical insignificance (in part because of the rising cost of college). Research from the center-left think tank Third Way claims that, in 2018, more than half of institutions left the majority of their students earning less than $28,000—the typical salary of a high school graduate.

In 2021, student loan debt in the United States amounted to $1.71 trillion owed by 45 million borrowers with an average student loan debt of $37,693, while the median value of an owner-occupied housing unit in the United States in the 2015–2019 American Community Survey 5-year estimates was $217,500 (with the ratio of average student loan debt to a median owner-housing unit value amounting to approximately 17 percent).

In December 2022, the Government Accountability Office (GAO) issued a report requested by U.S. House Education and Labor Committee Ranking Member Virginia Foxx that surveyed and assessed the financial aid offer letters of a nationally representative sample of 176 colleges on ten best practices recommended by the Financial Literacy and Education Commission in 2019 and found that 91 percent of the colleges surveyed did not include an estimate of the net price of attending the institution or understated the estimated net price, that approximately two-thirds of the colleges surveyed followed five or fewer of the ten best practices, that no college followed all ten, and that at least one college followed none. Additionally, the GAO found that only 3 percent of the colleges surveyed used a standardized Department of Education form that conforms to the best practices for financial aid offers to students (while only one-third used it as a supplementary form to their own financial aid offer letters), and in interviews with college financial aid officers, the GAO found that some colleges intentionally withhold information to prevent sticker shock and to not put themselves at a competitive disadvantage with colleges that do not include such disclosures. The GAO recommended that Congress consider legislation requiring college financial aid offer letters include clear and standard information following the best practices as federal law does not currently require standardized disclosures from colleges.

In May 2024, the Department of Education announced that the student loan interest rate for the 2024–2025 academic year would be 6.53% for undergraduate loans, 8.08% for postgraduate loans, and 9.08% for PLUS Loans, which was the highest undergraduate rate in more than a decade and the highest postgraduate and PLUS Loan rates in more than two decades.

=== Research findings ===
Other research shows that selection of a four-year college as compared to a two-year junior college, even by marginal students such as those with a C+ grade average in high school and SAT scores in the mid-800s, increases the probability of graduation and confers substantial economic and social benefits for most undergraduates. However, the admission of so many marginal students does impact graduation rates, partly due to the need for these students to take noncredit remedial courses in English, reading, math or science. Some fields of study produce many more graduates than the professions can take in. Due to the resulting higher education bubble, these graduates often have to consider jobs for which they are overqualified, or that have no academic requirements. Employers have responded to the oversupply of graduates by raising the academic requirements of many occupations higher than is really necessary to perform the work.

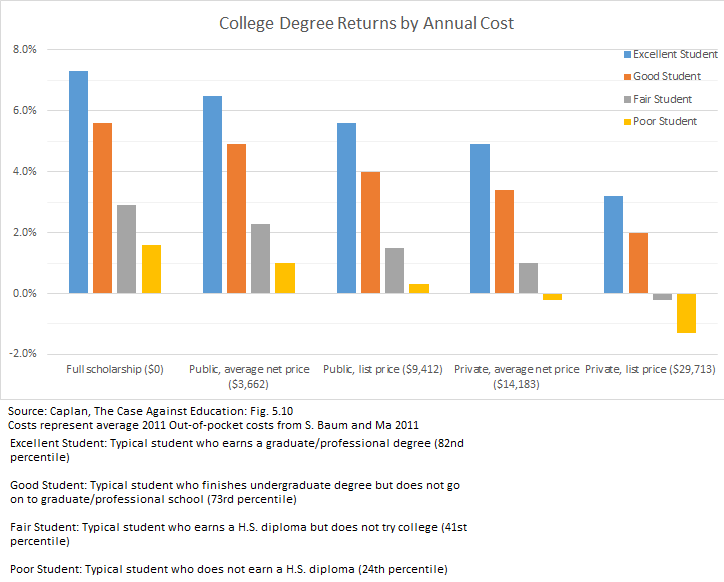
College Degree Returns by Average 2011 Annual Out-of-Pocket Costs, from B. Caplan's The Case Against Education

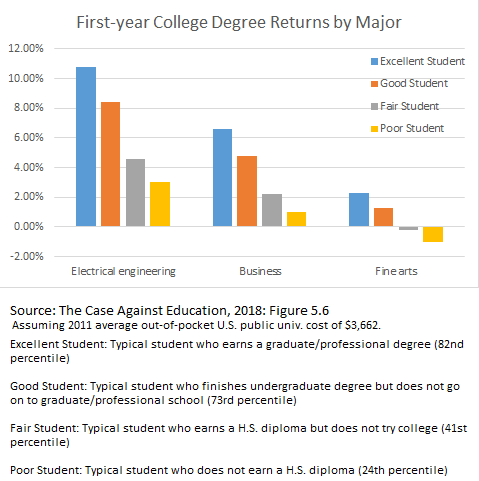
First-year U.S. college degree returns for select majors, by type of student.

In The Theory of the Leisure Class (1899), economist Thorstein Veblen observed that "Conspicuous consumption of valuable goods is a means of reputability to the gentleman of leisure", and that conspicuous leisure is the "non-productive consumption of time. Time is consumed non-productively (1) from a sense of the unworthiness of productive work, and (2) as an evidence of pecuniary ability to afford a life of idleness."

In The Case Against Education (2018), economist Bryan Caplan notes that the bulk of what students learn is quickly forgotten after final examinations. It merely serves the purpose of signalling to employers that a graduate is probably brilliant, diligent, and willing to tolerate serious boredom. To remedy this situation, he proposes a massive shift in emphasis from academic degrees to vocational training. Public spending on university education should be eliminated so that underemployment-prone degrees will become less attractive to students of average ability. The vast public funds thus saved could then be redirected to other purposes.

Failure to acquire degree-relevant employment soon after graduation often has a long-term impact on one's career, particularly for women and those with non-STEM degrees. In 2019, the United States Census Bureau reported that majoring in STEM does not always guarantee a position in that occupation, however they earned a much higher salary than college educated workers who did not. Students can reduce the risk of underemployment by thorough evaluation of the employment prospects of each major, by taking full advantage of work experience programs, by choosing a high-demand specialization within a profession, and by acquiring broadly desirable skills. In addition to those that are specific to a particular profession, employers in any profession are looking for evidence of critical thinking and analytical reasoning skills, teamworking skills, information literacy, ethical judgment, decision-making skills, fluency in speaking and writing English, problem solving skills, and a wide knowledge of liberal arts and sciences.

People with higher education have always tended to have higher salaries and less unemployment than people with less education. However, the type of degree has a large impact on future earnings. Average annual earnings range from $27,000 for high school dropouts to $80,000 for those with a graduate degree. Undergraduate earnings range from $46,000 in education to $85,000 in architecture and engineering. Graduate earnings for those same majors are $61,000 and $107,000 respectively. It must be kept in mind, however, that these figures are only averages. There is a significant amount of overlap in the earning power of different levels of education, and the different fields of study.

Although vocational education is usually less financially lucrative in the long term than a bachelor's degree, it can still provide a respectable income at much less cost in time and money, sometimes with the option of upgrading to a bachelor's degree at a later date. Even ten years after graduation, there are many people with a certificate or associate degree who earn more money than those with a B.A. It can also benefit university graduates, since some four-year schools fail to prepare their graduates for the kinds of jobs that are available in their surrounding regions. One in twelve community college students already possess a bachelor's degree.

Gainful employment is a concept that ties college attainment with improved job opportunities. In 2010, the Obama Administration began enacting gainful employment policies that required career colleges to maintain transparency and accountability about their effectiveness, and tied federal Title IV funding with gainful employment performance. Under Department of Education Secretary Betsy DeVos, these policies have been unraveled, partly because they did not apply to non-profit and public colleges. They have been replaced by the Department of Education's College Scorecard, which enables students to see the socio-economic diversity, SAT/ACT scores, graduation rates, and average earnings and debt of graduates at all colleges.

PayScale's analysis of schools and return on investment shows that a number of schools have a negative ROI. PayScale also offers analysis of College ROI by career path.

In 2018, the Urban Institute published a report on college ROI, noting that "Although higher education pays off for many, the exact returns for an individual are highly uncertain and evolve over time." The report added that factors include "the cost of higher education after grants; the length of time in school and the likelihood of certificate or degree completion; the earnings returns from a given level of degree, major, or institution; the student's demographic background; and local economic conditions."

=== College majors sorted by employment rates, wages and graduate degrees ===
The table below lists data on the unemployment, underemployment, median wages, and graduate degrees of various fields of study, as reported by the Federal Reserve Bank of New York, the United States Census Bureau, and the American Community Survey, as of 2021. The unemployment, underemployment and early career figures are for recent college graduates (less than 28 years of age).

College Major	Unemployment rate	Underemployment rate	Median Wage Early Career	Median Wage Mid-Career	Share with Graduate Degree
Accounting	3.3%	22.6%	$54,000	$80,000	31.1%
Advertising and public relations	4.6%	39.2%	$50,000	$80,000	19.0%
Aerospace engineering	6.6%	27.7%	$72,000	$112,000	49.4%
Agriculture	2.4%	52.1%	$45,000	$70,000	21.0%
Animal and plant sciences	4.4%	52.5%	$42,000	$67,000	34.7%
Anthropology	6.5%	53.3%	$40,000	$65,000	46.3%
Architecture	2.1%	29.1%	$50,000	$85,000	38.7%
Art history	5.3%	48.8%	$48,000	$64,000	41.8%
Biochemistry	4.7%	37.4%	$45,000	$85,000	70.3%
Biology	4.7%	46.8%	$40,000	$75,000	62.9%
Business analytics	2.2%	24.8%	$66,000	$99,000	24.7%
Business management	5.0%	55.1%	$46,000	$75,000	24.6%
Chemical engineering	4.1%	19.6%	$75,000	$120,000	47.4%
Chemistry	3.4%	39.5%	$47,000	$85,000	65.4%
Civil engineering	3.4%	15.1%	$65,000	$100,000	38.6%
Commercial art and graphic design	7.9%	33.5%	$43,000	$70,000	11.8%
Communication studies	5.8%	52.7%	$47,000	$75,000	24.2%
Computer engineering	3.7%	17.8%	$74,000	$114,000	40.0%
Computer science	4.8%	19.1%	$73,000	$105,000	31.8%
Construction services	1.4%	17.7%	$60,000	$100,000	9.9%
Criminal justice	4.5%	71.3%	$43,900	$70,000	24.1%
Early childhood education	3.1%	24.5%	$40,000	$43,000	40.8%
Earth sciences	3.6%	38.8%	$40,000	$70,000	43.8%
Economics	5.5%	35.3%	$60,000	$100,000	42.6%
Electrical engineering	3.2%	15.4%	$70,000	$109,000	47.7%
Elementary education	1.8%	15.2%	$40,000	$48,000	49.0%
Engineering technologies	7.1%	39.6%	$62,000	$90,000	24.3%
English language	6.3%	48.7%	$40,000	$65,000	47.5%
Environmental studies	5.1%	50.2%	$45,000	$68,000	32.5%
Ethnic studies	4.4%	53.7%	$45,000	$66,000	49.7%
Family and consumer sciences	8.9%	47.9%	$37,000	$60,000	32.9%
Finance	4.1%	28.7%	$60,000	$100,000	30.6%
Fine arts	12.1%	55.4%	$40,000	$65,000	23.2%
Foreign language	7.8%	50.1%	$43,000	$65,000	50.5%
General business	5.3%	52.4%	$50,000	$80,000	25.2%
General education	1.8%	22.9%	$40,200	$51,000	50.1%
General engineering	5.9%	25.3%	$60,000	$100,000	37.0%
General social sciences	5.4%	50.6%	$43,000	$65,000	38.5%
Geography	4.4%	44.5%	$48,000	$75,000	32.6%
Health services	5.2%	45.6%	$40,000	$60,000	51.8%
History	5.8%	49.1%	$50,000	$70,000	50.2%
Industrial engineering	4.6%	18.3%	$70,000	$100,000	36.9%
Information systems and management	6.4%	24.7%	$54,000	$90,000	25.6%
Interdisciplinary studies	4.8%	46.3%	$41,800	$70,000	37.7%
International relations	7.1%	49.3%	$50,000	$86,000	45.6%
Journalism	6.5%	47.7%	$45,000	$75,000	27.0%
Leisure and hospitality	5.3%	58.6%	$38,000	$60,000	34.1%
Liberal arts	6.2%	55.2%	$40,000	$63,000	30.0%
Marketing	6.6%	52.0%	$50,000	$85,000	18.6%
Mass media	8.4%	51.7%	$40,000	$75,000	21.2%
Mathematics	5.8%	30.7%	$59,000	$88,000	52.4%
Mechanical engineering	5.3%	15.8%	$70,000	$105,000	39.2%
Medical technicians	5.8%	59.5%	$51,000	$71,000	24.6%
Miscellaneous biological sciences	6.3%	48.6%	$42,000	$70,000	60.9%
Miscellaneous education	0.6%	16.7%	$40,000	$56,000	56.6%
Miscellaneous engineering	3.4%	22.9%	$68,000	$100,000	45.8%
Miscellaneous physical sciences	5.5%	23.2%	$52,000	$104,000	57.1%
Miscellaneous technologies	5.9%	48.4%	$48,000	$80,000	18.5%
Nursing	1.3%	10.1%	$55,000	$75,000	29.3%
Nutrition sciences	1.8%	45.0%	$45,000	$60,000	46.3%
Performing arts	7.6%	64.0%	$39,000	$62,000	38.5%
Pharmacy	4.8%	14.7%	$55,000	$100,000	65.1%
Philosophy	9.1%	57.1%	$42,000	$68,000	56.5%
Physics	6.1%	34.9%	$53,000	$80,000	69.8%
Political science	6.9%	49.2%	$50,000	$80,000	53.6%
Psychology	4.7%	47.6%	$37,400	$65,000	51.0%
Public policy and law	7.4%	49.4%	$45,000	$70,000	46.1%
Secondary education	2.6%	27.0%	$40,400	$52,000	51.2%
Social services	3.0%	27.7%	$37,000	$52,000	52.4%
Sociology	9.0%	51.3%	$40,000	$61,000	38.3%
Special education	2.7%	17.7%	$40,000	$52,000	60.7%
Theology and religion	3.6%	35.5%	$36,000	$52,000	44.9%
Treatment therapy	5.7%	41.3%	$48,000	$69,000	50.7%
Overall	5.1%	39.8%	$50,000	$75,000	38.7%

== Socioeconomic status ==
Socioeconomic status can play a significant role in an individual's enrollment, performance, and completion of their college degree and pursuit of higher education.

Children with parents in the top 1% of the income distribution are 77 times more likely to attend an elite college or university than children with parents in the bottom 20% of the income distribution, according to a 2018 study.

=== Enrollment ===
The National Center for Education Statistics reports that in 2009 high school graduates from low-income families enrolled in college immediately at a rate of 55%. In comparison, 84% of high school graduates from high-income families enrolled immediately into college. Middle-class families also saw lower rates with 67% enrolling in college immediately. It also found that a high percentage of students who delayed enrollment in college attended high schools that had a high level of participation in the free and reduced lunch program. Students who work long hours in high school are less likely to pursue post-secondary education. Students who had access to financial aid contacts were more likely to enroll in higher education than students who did not have these contacts.

When considering how a college degree affects labor market outcomes, it is especially important to consider differences in socioeconomic status (SES). For example, research shows that students of low SES are more likely than their high SES peers to delay entering a college. This delay can cause different effects for different students. For example, research shows that students who delayed at least one year after high school were 64% less likely to complete their degree as opposed to those who enroll immediately after high school. In the same study, Bozick and DeLuca found that the average time delay for students in the lowest SES quartile was 13 months, while for students in higher SES quartiles averaged about 4 months.

Research in the area of delayed college enrollment is not extensive, however, a clear theme emerges in that lower SES students constitute a much larger percentage of students that delay enrollment, while students of higher SES tend to enroll immediately after high school. According to a similar study "an increase in family income of $10,000 decreases a student's odds of planning to delay by about 3%, and having a parent with a bachelor's degree decreases the odds of planning to delay by about 34%." This is significant, because by delaying enrollment low SES students are less likely to earn a college degree, and therefore they do not receive the benefits associated with completion.

=== Persistence and performance ===
A 2011 national study found that college students with a high socioeconomic status persisted in college 25% more than students with a low socioeconomic status. In fact, students with a high socioeconomic status are 1.55 times more likely to persist in college than students with a low socioeconomic status. Attaining even higher degrees than a bachelor's degree can also be affected by socioeconomic status. A 2008 study reports that 11% of students with low socioeconomic status report earning a master's, Doctor of Medicine, or Juris Doctor degree compared to 42% of high socioeconomic students. Analyst Jeffrey Selingo wondered whether higher education had less and less ability to level the playing field. A 2007 study found that 52% of low-income students who qualified for college enrolled within 2 years of graduation compared to 83% of high-income students.

Socioeconomic status can also influence performance rates once at a university. According to a 2008 study, students with a low socioeconomic status study less, work more hours, have less interaction with faculty, and are less likely to join extra-curricular activities. 42% of students with low socioeconomic status indicated that they worked more than 16 hours a week during school, with a high percentage working up to 40 hours a week, although such students may benefit since potential employers assign great importance to a graduate's work experience. This is also evidence of a positive relation between socioeconomic status and social integration at university. In other words, middle-class students take part in more formal and informal social activities and have a greater sense of belonging to their universities than do working-class students.

Completion

Suzanne Mettler notes in her book, Degrees of Inequality, that in 1970, 40% of U.S. students in top income quartile had achieved a bachelor's degree by the age of 24. By 2013, this percentage rose to 77%. For students in the bottom income quartile, only 6% had earned a bachelor's degree in 1970. By 2013, this percentage was still at a marginal 9%. Unfortunately, there have been and continue to be many barriers for students of lower socioeconomic status to get access.

There are certain organizations and programs that have capitalized on the idea that attaining a college degree, specifically at a top tier university, is critical to social mobility. However, even these accomplishments are minuscule, when we recognize that there are between 25,000 and 35,000 low income students that are qualified to gain entrance into the nation's top universities each year, but do not even apply.

== Race and ethnicity ==
National Center for Education Statistics data showed that black college graduates owed on average $25,000 more than white college graduates and 48 percent of black college graduates owed 12.5% more than they borrowed 4 years after graduation. In 2016, the Brookings Institution released a report finding that black graduates owed an average of $52,726 in total while white graduates owed an average of $28,006 and that the black-white disparity was due to differences in interest accrual and graduate school borrowing. The Urban Institute released a report using data from the 2014 Federal Reserve Survey of Household Economics and Decisionmaking (SHED) showing that among borrowers aged 25 to 55 who took on student loan debt to finance an undergraduate degree, Black borrowers owed $32,047 on average while white borrowers owed $18,685 and Hispanic borrowers owed $15,853.

A 2016 report by the Georgetown's Center on Education and the Workforce found that there were significant racial inequalities in access to higher education. The authors, Anthony Carnevale and Jeff Strohl, focused on Latinos and African American minority groups. Through their research they show that overall access for minority enrollment has increased at a greater rate than enrollment for white students, but this growth is heavily concentrated in the poorest, and least selective colleges and universities.

Growing inequality between universities has an effect on graduation rates and time to complete a degree for students. The study shows that more selective universities provide their students with better resources. The authors show that the 82 most selective colleges spend $27,900/student on average, while the least selective open access two- and four-year colleges (where Latinos and African Americans are over-represented) spend $6,000/student on average. Open-access colleges, are colleges that admit at least 80% of their students and typically include community colleges, for-profit schools, and some public universities. Graduation rates are the highest in the more selective universities, where more resources are available to students inside and outside of the universities. They further demonstrate that persistence and completion rates at more selective universities are higher regardless of race or ethnicity. The end product of this is the increased perpetuation of educational inequalities across generations.

=== Enrollment ===
Race can also play a role in which students enroll in college. The National Center for Education Statistics and the American Institutes for Research have released a report on college participation rates by race between the years 2000 and 2016.

Race	2000	2016
Asian	58%	58%
Mixed race	42%	42%
White	39%	42%
Hispanic	22%	39%
Black	31%	36%
Pacific Islander	21%	21%
Native American	19%	19%

Minority groups tend to remain the most underrepresented at more selective universities. This is despite programs like affirmative action that seek to provide underrepresented students with greater access to colleges. According to the National Center for Education Statistics, African American students suffer the most in regards to under-representation at more selective universities. Consider that the cumulative percent change for African American students at open access universities has increased by 113.6 percent since 1994, but that at top tier universities it has barely changed, having gone down by 0.3 percent. At Harvard, 6.5 percent of undergraduates were black in 2013, while it was 7.4 percent in 1994. At universities focusing on bachelors, and graduate degrees African American enrollment in 2013 had only increased by 3 percent since 1994.

According to the Pew Research Center, Hispanic students college enrollment has increased by 240 percent since 1996, more than their African American or White counterparts. However, this growth is similarly at the open access colleges and does not translate into enrollment at four-year colleges. A study by the Pew Research Center, claimed that "Young Hispanic college students are less likely than their white counterparts to enroll in a four-year college (56 percent versus 72 percent), they are less likely to attend a selective college, less likely to be enrolled in college full time, and less likely to complete a bachelor's degree." Given this information, it is clear that increased college enrollment may not mean that Hispanic students are reaping the benefits of completing a college degree.

=== Degrees conferred ===
According to Diverse Issues in Higher Education, the schools conferring the most bachelor's degrees to African Americans in 2015-16 were University of Phoenix, Ashford University, Georgia State University, and Grand Canyon University.

=== Miscellaneous Issues ===
Race can play a part in a student's persistence rate in college: Drop-out rates are highest with the Native American and African American population, both greater than 50 percent. White and Asian Americans had the lowest dropout rates. Another issue related to race is faculty representation at universities. According to data from the U.S. Department of Education, full-time faculty remain heavily white at universities across the country. In 2013, 78 percent of full-time faculty members nationwide were white.

== Educational experiences by gender ==
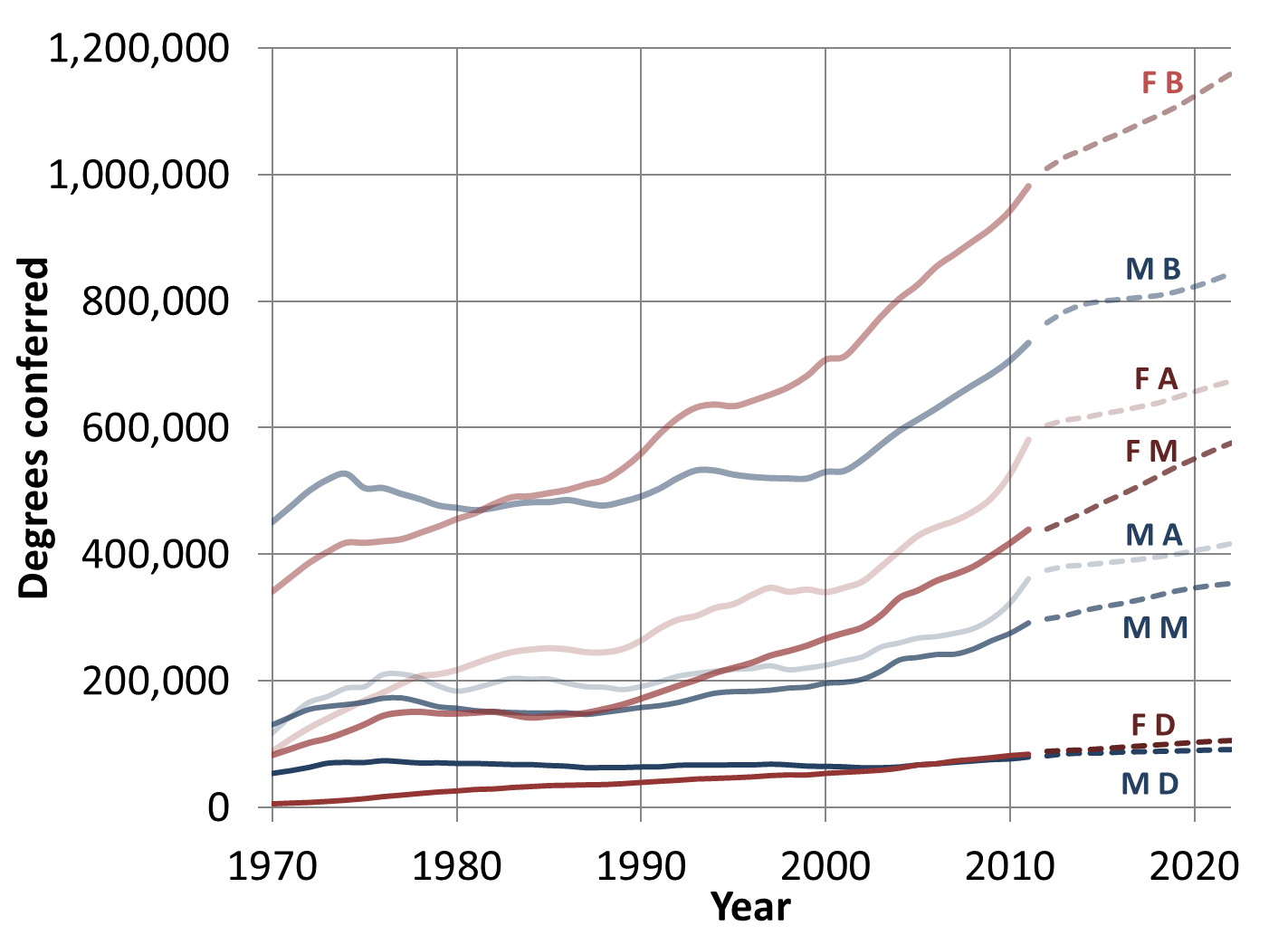
Degrees conferred in United States since 1970 by year, degree type, and gender (2011). Dashed lines are projected. Since 1982 more bachelor's degrees have been conferred on women. First label letters: F=female, M=male. Second label letters: A=Associate's, B=Bachelor's, M=Master's, D=Doctorate and professional degree.

In discussing students' access to education in the U.S., one area of research has focused on the differences that exist between their entry and completion rates based on gender. For children born after 1960, more white women have been graduating from college than white men, which represents a change from children born before this time.

A 2011 study found that the increase in inequality in education between low and high income groups observed over the previous 30 years had been predominantly driven by rising educational attainment among women from high-income backgrounds. In 2010–11, 33 percent more bachelor's degrees were conferred to women than men, with the gender gap projected to increase to 37 percent by 2021–22.

Within higher-income families, women make up a greater percentage (15 percent compared to 7 percent) of this growth. While the largest gap of educational attainment between men and women is seen in the highest income group, women are attaining higher levels of education than men in every income group. This observation poses a unique and confusing problem: if educational attainment has a positive correlation to familial income, why are more women entering and completing college than men? Bailey and Dynarski proposed that the observed educational gap by gender may be due to differing incentives to accumulate human capital. Men and women may participate in what they term "segregated labor markets" and "asymmetric marriage markets," and perhaps, to make up for those perceived market differences, woman are more motivated to obtain higher levels of education.

The gap of educational attainment between men and women is starting at a young age and affecting students access to higher education later in life. According to Bailey & Dynarski, there are two main explanations for the gender differences in educational attainment and inequality. First, men and women respond in different and gender-specific ways to family and/or school circumstances, and second, the differences in circumstances by men and women of the same family income and race have shaped inequality in educational attainment for some time. More specifically, the bulk of primary and secondary teachers are female and women run most single-parent households. The absence of a strong male role model affects males differently from females. Studies by Bailey & Dynarski have shown that teachers provide role models to demographically similar students, and their unintended biases affect their interactions and assessments of their students.

Women in America hold nearly two thirds of all student loan debt.

=== Sexual orientation and gender identity ===
An April 2017 statement from the official blog of the American Council on Education (ACE) reported,

"Most LGBTQ students report that the climate— their feelings of belonging, safety and inclusion— in college is better than the one they experienced in high school. And evidence exists that overall, campus climate has improved over the last 15 years. Yet this progress is not consistent across institutions. Reports of harassment and discrimination, especially for transgender students, remain a problem at a time when student learning and persistence are central issues for higher education leaders. Of particular concern are student reports of harassment in classrooms and other learning contexts, of widespread cyber bullying, and of the amplification of racism and sexism through homophobic and transphobic harassment. Research on campus climate generally and LGBTQ climate specifically points to the negative consequences of hostile climates for student learning, persistence in college and mental health and wellness."

The 2019 Youth Risk Behavior Survey found that high school students in America who identified as lesbian, gay, or bisexual stated that they had contemplated suicide at a rate three times higher than straight-identified students. Organizations such as the children's rights group Child Trends have attributed these trends and other effects of malformed child development that have lasting influence throughout both teenage and later years to pervasive discrimination in the U.S., with American educational institutions having to deal with multiple dozen state legislatures proposing prejudicial legal measures in the 2020s.

== Undocumented students ==
It is estimated that 65,000 undocumented immigrants finish high school each year. These students have lived in the United States for more than 5 years and most were often brought to the United States by their parents as young children. This leaves the U.S. Government with the question of what rights to give the undocumented immigrants after they finish high school, particularly with access to higher education. A 2010 study conducted at the University of Nevada, Las Vegas (UNLV) on undocumented immigrants and higher education:

Installing pathways to higher education and in-state tuition for undocumented students in the United States presents both opportunities and constraints in developing practices that promote social justice, equity, and equality. Those who are sympathetic to the challenges facing undocumented students may support opportunities to promote the potential of those who are deserving of incorporation and membership in U.S. society. On the other hand, proponents of tighter borders and tougher immigration laws may view all undocumented people, including model, hardworking young people, as "illegals" or temporary workers and consider them to be drains on the resources of society. This puts educational administrators in precarious positions since they are professionals who are trained to promote and support students in their pursuit of knowledge and self-improvement. Therefore, many professionals are left with little choice but to search for individuals and resources already established within outlaw cultures."

In 1996, the United States passed a law banning states from offering residency benefits to undocumented immigrants that they didn't then also offer to every U.S. citizen. This basically made it so that states could not offer in-state tuition to undocumented immigrants, even if they technically qualified based on residency status. States have argued the clarity of this law and many have enacted their own laws allowing in-state tuition to be given on the claims that it is based on high school attendance and not explicitly residency. This law is especially important since undocumented immigrants are also unable to obtain governmental financial aid and are unable to legally work, leaving them without sources to help pay for out-of-state tuition.

The DREAM Act was introduced in 2001 and aimed to give more access to higher education for undocumented immigrants by repealing the law 1996 law. It also aimed to set up pathways for students who obtain higher education to become legal residents. The act has been introduced in many states and many different times, but has still not been passed. Critics of the act argue that it encourages more undocumented immigration, that schools will engage in grade inflation so that border-line students can take advantage of the act, and that a financial burden could be placed on taxpayers. Proponents argue the opposite, emphasizing that giving the undocumented immigrants an opportunity at higher education means they will be more self-sufficient in the future, contributing more to taxes and relying less on state resources. They also claim that children should not be punished for the actions of their parents and that giving them this opportunity would encourage them to be contributing and law-abiding citizens. Whether this act would have positive effects on undocumented immigrants attending college is still hard to see since not many states have actually done it and the time span has not been enough for thorough research.

== Educational outcomes ==
Six years after entering a four-year program, 58 percent of students at public colleges will have graduated, 65 percent of students at private non-profit colleges will have graduated, while 27 percent of students at for-profit colleges will have graduated. Six-year graduation rates of four-year programs depend to a great extent on a college's entrance requirements, ranging from 89 percent at those which accept less than one-quarter of applicants to 36 percent at those with an open admissions policy.

=== Academic standards ===
Grade inflation has been prevalent at American colleges since the 1960s. Between 1965 and 1975, GPAs sharply increased so that the most common letter grade went from "C" to a "B." Since the mid-1990s it has been an "A." Unlike GPAs, overall test scores have remained relatively steady over time, and graduate literacy has remained constant. As the proportion of the student population going into higher education has grown to include those of average ability, universities either have to accept a low graduation rate, or accommodate them with a decline in academic standards, facilitated by grade inflation.

Financial pressures have made college administrations increasingly reluctant to lose the tuition obligations of students who might otherwise be failed or expelled, and to fill their classrooms they must accept students who may not be able to complete a four-year degree in four years.

== Political views ==
Research has been done since the 1970s into the political views of faculty members and whether this influences the student experience. Lecturers are more liberal supporting the Democratic party than the general population. 58 percent of Americans thought that college professors' political bias was a "serious problem", with this concerning 91 percent of "very conservative" adults, but only 3 percent of liberals. Research showed this did not affect their performance.

Free speech on the campus is assumed. Some universities have been hit by lawsuits from right-wing groups who claim that they have facilitated disruptive actions by left-wing groups. Some professors have claimed that their universities teach controversial views, but prohibit any criticism of those views in class.

The Anti-Defamation League verified more than 300 incidents of white nationalist hate propaganda at more than 200 college and university campuses in 2018.

== Access issues ==
=== Rural, urban, and suburban ===
A slightly lower percentage of college-age Americans from rural areas go to college: in 2015, 67 percent from suburban high schools, 62 percent from urban high schools, and 59 percent from rural high schools. The difference is even larger for higher-income schools (73% suburban, 72% urban, 61% rural).

=== Geographic considerations ===
While many private liberal arts colleges are located in the Midwest and Northeast, population growth of 18-year-olds is strongest in the South and Southwest, making it more difficult to attract potential students to "fly halfway across the country" to get a degree. However, this problem may solve itself, since many such colleges in states with static populations are being forced to close due to declining enrollments.

=== Skepticism about higher education ===
Demonstrated ability in reading, mathematics, and writing, as typically measured in the United States by the SAT or similar tests such as the ACT, have often replaced colleges' individual entrance exams, and is often required for admission to higher education. There is some question as to whether advanced mathematical skills or talent are in fact necessary for fields such as history, English, philosophy, or art.

=== Declining accessibility and high cost ===
According to an analysis of social mobility and higher education in the U.S. by Equality of Opportunity, "colleges that offered many low-income students pathways to success are becoming less accessible over time."

According to a 2017 Public Agenda poll, only 43 percent of Americans say private, nonprofit universities and colleges are worth the cost.

Thousands of U.S. college students rely on sponsors to make ends meet.

== Student welfare ==
=== Student debt ===
One of the dysfunctions of higher education is rapidly growing student loan debt that may take decades to repay, even if students never graduate. Several student debt groups have been created since 2014, after the Debt Collective paid off student loans for 3,700 Everest College students.

=== Affirmative action ===
The Trump administration's Department of Justice reportedly conducted investigations to end affirmative action programs for racial minorities in college admissions. In a 2019 Pew Research Center poll, 73 percent of a representative sample of Americans said that race or ethnicity should not be a factor in college admissions.

On June 29, 2023, the Supreme Court of the United States issued a ruling that ended affirmative action in higher education, with the exception of military academies.

=== Alcohol and drug abuse ===
Alcohol and drug abuse are serious concerns on U.S. college campuses. They are related to other campus social problems, such as fraternity hazing. and sexual assault.

According to the 2016 National Survey on Drug Use and Health, "more than one-third of full-time college students aged 18 to 22 engaged in binge drinking as against 1 in 4 adults in the past month; about 1 in 5 used an illicit drug (which includes marijuana) in the past month." The report added that "on an average day during the past year, from about 9.0 million full-time college students 2,179 drank alcohol for the first time, and 1,326 used an illicit drug for the first time."

=== Sexual assault ===
Campus sexual assault is difficult to quantify. According to the anti-sexual assault group RAINN, which uses data from the U.S. Department of Justice and the Association of American Universities, 13 percent of all undergraduate and graduate students experience rape or sexual assault in some form. These figures are 26.4 percent for female and 6.8 percent for male students.

Some critics have argued that colleges have been overly aggressive in enforcing Title IX regulations. According to these critics, colleges have empowered investigators to routinely presume the guilt of suspects, assign to the man full responsibility for the outcome of any social interaction, and minutely regulate personal relationships. The Trump administration rescinded Obama-era measures on campus sexual assault.

=== Student poverty and hunger ===
Research by Sara Goldrick-Rab and others found that more than half of all community-college students surveyed struggle with food insecurity. A follow-up study found more than a third of college students don't always have enough to eat and lack stable housing. Nine percent of those surveyed were homeless.

=== Higher education and mental health ===
In an analysis of 165 studies and news stories, researchers at North Carolina State and Penn State University found the most common contributing factors to students' mental health challenges were race, violence and sexual assault.

An American Psychiatric Association survey "Healthy Minds" found that the rate of mental health treatment among college students increased from 19 percent in 2007 to 34 percent by 2017. The percentage of students who reported lifetime diagnoses increased from 22 percent to 36 percent. The prevalence of depression and suicidality also increased, while stigma about mental health decreased. The web-based survey consisted of 155,026 students from 196 college campuses.

Latino college students are more likely to have a greater history of depression than other ethnic groups. Mental health stigma is a contributing factor of anxiety in Latino college students and include having common beliefs such as those with mental illness being perceived as dangerous, not willing to recover, and at fault for their own illness. A recent study states that the sample of Latino students perceive that budget cuts are affecting them in specific ways. This includes diminishing access, reduction of support services, and delay in completion of their educational objectives. Research shows that through advancing a model of intersectionality that recognizes how social identities are constituted within multiple arenas of social interactions, then it helps in addressing how the relationships between Latino social identities shape Latino educational outcomes and educational equity.

=== Bias reporting ===
The 1980s and 1990s saw judicial challenges against college and university speech codes in the United States. One example was the 1989 case Doe v. University of Michigan. By 1991 at least 100 colleges and universities had regulations attempting to counter bias (and racism etc.). A bias reporting system was started in Cornell University in 2001, at Ohio State University in 2006, and at University of Richmond in 2008. Depending on the campus different terms are used such as "Campus Climate Response Team", "Just Knights Response Team" and "Bias Incident Response Team".

Across the spectrum of bias reporting systems in campuses, there is no standard definition of what constitutes bias. A bias incident can be explained as non-criminal "conduct, speech or expression motivated in whole or in part, by bias or prejudice". It can include microaggressions and the creation of unwanted campus climate. Administrators must balance simultaneous promotion of campus diversity and campus free speech. They are part of larger efforts to improve campus climate, a balancing act. The concept of bias response teams has both supporters and detractors, with the exact role of the teams still under consideration. In 2016, University of Northern Colorado dissolved its bias response team in favour for other institutional mechanisms.

== Education of medical professionals ==
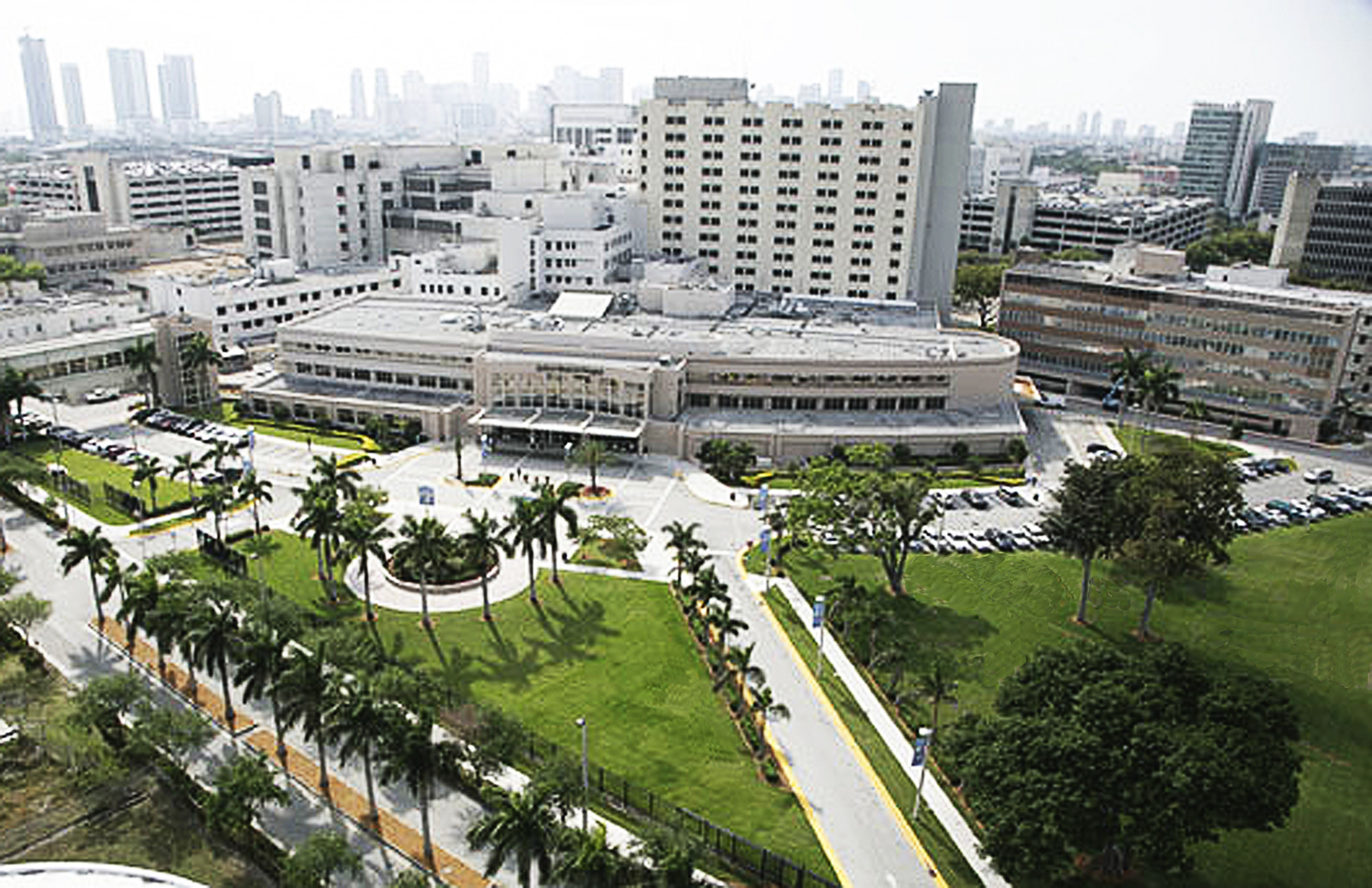
Jackson Memorial Hospital in Miami, Florida, the primary teaching hospital for the Miller School of Medicine at the University of Miami

Concerns of a current and future shortage of medical doctors due to the supply and demand for physicians in the United States have come from multiple entities including professional bodies such as the American Medical Association (AMA). The subject has been analyzed as well by the American news media in publications such as Forbes, The Nation, and Newsweek. In the 2010s, a study released by the Association of American Medical Colleges (AAMC) titled The Complexities of Physician Supply and Demand: Projections From 2019 to 2034 specifically projected a shortage of between 37,800 and 124,000 individuals within the following two decades, approximately.

The AMA has cited increasing costs of higher education in America as a barrier to adequate growth in physician supply. In a 2022 article, the organization stated that "[m]edical school graduates typically finish school with about $200,000 in medical student-loan debt, which is often seen as an influential factor in specialty choice." The discussion of anticipated financial burdens from schooling itself can also result in a self-fulfilling prophecy. In December 2021, an article from the financial publication Forbes argued that the "lack of funding for residency slots to expand the pool of physicians in the U.S. has been an issue for more than two decades." Healthcare in America itself may deteriorate for certain communities due to such trends, particularly in terms of the lack of access to specialty services in rural areas.

== Recent controversies ==
The supply of graduates in many fields of study is exceeding the demand for their skills, which aggravates graduate unemployment, underemployment, credentialism and educational inflation.

In the United States, there are an estimated 44 million Americans with a combined $1.3 trillion in student loan debt, as of 2017. Advocates advise parents to not send their children to college unless these children are committed to pursuing their future education. An increasing number of freshman every year drop out of their perspective programs or do not possess the maturity to have a balanced life away from home.

=== Online Education ===
Charles Murray argues that with the development of the Internet, the scholarship that flourishes through colleagueships no longer exists, because the scholars could now be informed with the most up-to-date publications in a specific field, and use other scholars' ideas for reference now. According to these scholars, the four-year brick-and-mortar residential college fail to teach the students to make a living. Colleges should be a place for people to learn how to make a living instead of a place that simply offers 32 semester-long courses. The classrooms in these colleges are inefficient, and people could learn more quickly by themselves. In order to become skillful and professional in a certain area, 32 course are too many. Moreover, work experiences are more important than course work for some of the occupations including high-school teacher and journalist. Next, most academic sources such as technical journals and books are available and searchable online for a price or for free now. Therefore, libraries in the colleges only provide a pleasant surrounding for students to study nowadays. The system of colleagueships, which is the basic for colleges, is fading. With the development of science and technology, the scholars could now contact and communicate with each other using emails and the internet. Moreover, they could get updated with the latest academic news and information in every field. Therefore, the physical proximity is no longer an advantage of a brick-and-mortar college. Additionally, the technology of distance learning now enables students to communicate with the teachers online. Students could purchase online courses or videotape in order to learn something. As a result, colleges lost its advantage to some extent.

However, the interaction between teachers and students are not easy in distant learning. Moreover, statistics from the U.S. Bureau of Labor Statistics indicate that the college educated are employed at a rate nearly twice that of the national average when compared to high school graduates. The type of degree one pursues will determine how safe and prosperous their career path is. A study published by the Pew Charitable Trusts, shows that among Americans ages 21 to 24, the drop in employment and income was much steeper among people who lacked a college degree. "Among those whose highest degree was a high school diploma, only 55 percent had jobs even before the downturn, and that fell to 47 percent after it. For young people with an associate degree, the employment rate fell from 64 to 57. Bachelor's degree slipped from 69 to 65."

Moreover, in recent years, with the rapid development of the science and technology, there has been an increasing demand for higher education. People receive systematic training through higher education, which means that they not only acquire knowledge, but also improve their research ability and learning skills in college. Higher education does not only benefit individuals, but also play an important role in the current skilled labor market, as education level has become one of the recruiting requirements. Andrew Delbanco, for example, has mentioned in his article that college degrees had already replaced high school diplomas and become the minimum requirement in the job market. Many employers believe that employees with higher educational levels tend to be more effective and efficient at work, because they have acquired specialized knowledge in a certain area as well as the ability to do research and solve problems independently. Since the college degree reflects a person's education level, it is not surprising that one with a higher education would earn more.

== Interest groups ==
Interest groups in U.S. higher education include philanthropic foundations, trade unions, trade associations, think tanks, and businesses associated with higher education. Philanthropic organizations include the Bill and Melinda Gates Foundation, the Walton Family Foundation, and the Charles Koch Foundation. Trade unions tied to higher education include the American Association of University Professors, American Federation of Teachers, and Service Employees International Union. Trade associations: include the American Council on Education, American Association of Community Colleges, American Association of State Colleges and Universities, and Association of American Universities. Think tanks reporting on higher education include the Lumina Foundation, Center for American Progress, Brookings Institution, Third Way, and Cato Institute. Businesses associated with higher education include student loan lenders, student loan debt collectors, academic publishers, and online program management companies. Notable companies include Wells Fargo, Discover Financial Services, Navient, Sallie Mae, Pearson, and Prentice Hall.

== See also ==
- Discrimination in the United States
- History of education in the United States
- Medical education in the United States
- Poverty in the United States
- African American student access to medical schools
- Confidence in higher education in the United States
