= Young Worker March on Washington =

Political rally for workers' rights

- Part of Labor history of the United States
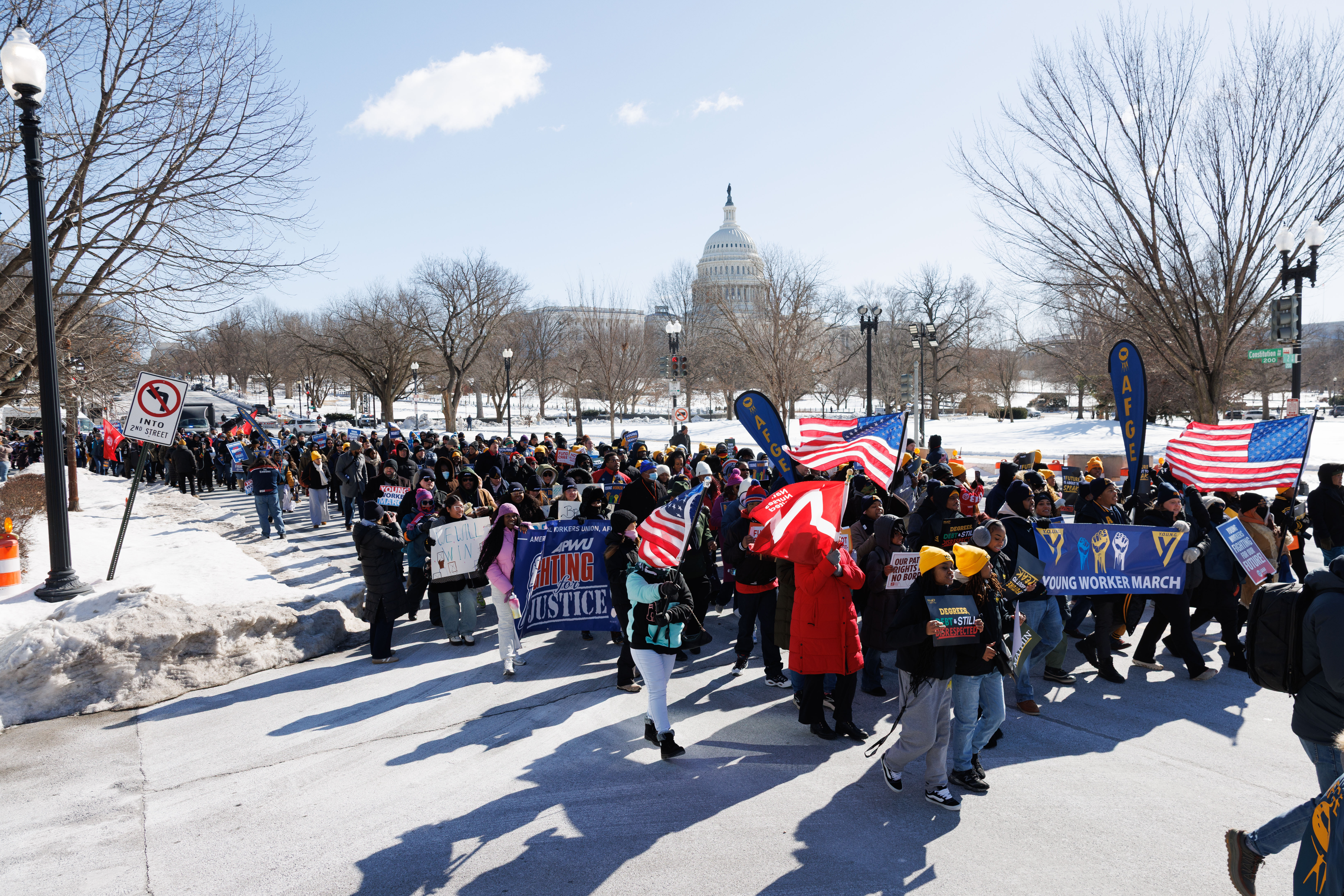
- Date: February 7, 2026
- Location: United States, with march in Washington, D.C.
- Caused by: Living wage, healthcare, education, housing and union rights concerns
- Goals: Federal living wage; Public option for healthcare or expansion of Medicare; Reduced medicine prices; Universal child care and universal preschool; Guarantee bargaining rights; Expand home buyer programs and cap rent increases; Expand student loan forgiveness and fund tuition free community colleges; Federal support for diversity, equity, and inclusion
- Methods: Protest march

The Young Worker March on Washington is a protest event that took place on February 7, 2026, in Washington, D.C., to defend young workers' economic rights in the United States. It was organized by the Y.O.U.N.G. Worker committee of the American Federation of Government Employees (AFGE) and the American Federation of Labor and Congress of Industrial Organizations (AFL-CIO). An AFGE vice president, Dr. Kendrick Roberson, served as a lead organizer for the event.

== Description ==
=== Organizers and partners ===
The march was organized by the Y.O.U.N.G. Worker committee of the American Federation of Government Employees (AFGE) and the American Federation of Labor and Congress of Industrial Organizations (AFL-CIO). AFGE's national vice president for the Women and Fair Practices division, former Y.O.U.N.G. committee chair Dr. Kendrick Roberson, served as a lead organizer for the event.

Partners for the march include the American Postal Workers Union, the National Association of Letter Carriers, the 50501 movement, National Nurses United, the International Association of Machinists and Aerospace Workers, International Union of Painters and Allied Trades, the NAACP, the Coalition of Black Trade Unionists, Black Voters Matter, the Labor Council for Latin American Advancement, the Asian Pacific American Labor Alliance, the Service Employees International Union, United Auto Workers, United States Student Association and others.

=== Events ===
The march began on February 7, 2026, at the Hyatt Regency on Capitol Hill. Much of the event was moved indoors because of extreme cold on the day of the march. Marchers walked to the U.S. Capitol’s West Front, the site of presidential inaugurations and the January 6 United States Capitol attack in 2021, then returned to the Hyatt Regency for speeches and strategizing.

Speakers at the rally included AFL-CIO president Liz Schuler, AFGE District 14 National Vice President Ottis Johnson Jr., and leaders from the American Postal Workers Union, Labor Council for Latin American Advancement, Asian Pacific American Labor Alliance, Pride at Work, Coalition of Black Trade Unionists, National Nurses United, Machinists Union, Black Youth Vote, USSA, the NAACP, United Auto Workers, and Black Voters Matter. The event raised more than $50,000 to help offset costs with the help of the event sponsors.

== Goals ==
The march aimed to address a number of socioeconomic issues connected to the federal government in the United States, including crises of affordability, housing , health care, childcare, and student debt.

=== Demands ===
The march demands included:

- A guaranteed federal living wage with inflation adjustments
  - An automatic cost of living adjustment for federal employees.
- A public option for healthcare or the expansion of Medicare
  - A federal cap on medicine prices via expanded Medicare negotiating power
- Federally funded universal child care and universal preschool
- Guaranteed bargaining rights and union time for federal employees
  - Passage of the Protecting the Right to Organize (PRO) Act
- Expansion of first-time home buyer programs and a cap on rent increases in federally subsidized housing
- Expansion of student loan forgiveness and the funding of tuition free community colleges
- Federal funding of vocational training programs for the trades
- Federal support for diversity, equity, and inclusion programs to increase access to education
