= SBX =

SBX may refer to:

- Sea-based X-band Radar, a type of a floating, self-propelled, mobile radar station
- Snowboard cross, a snowboard competition
- sbX, a bus rapid transit service in San Bernardino County, California, U.S.
- Super Bowl X
- South Bay Expressway, a toll road in San Diego County, California, U.S.
- SBX, the airport code for Shelby Airport near Shelby, Montana, U.S.
- .sbx, a file format that stores an optional spatial index of the features of a shapefile
- Student book exchange, a book swapping or textbook exchange service provided by various colleges and universities for their students
- SBX, Sandbox - for an IT environment
- SBX, Snowboardcross
