= Graduate unemployment =

Unemployment among people with an academic degree

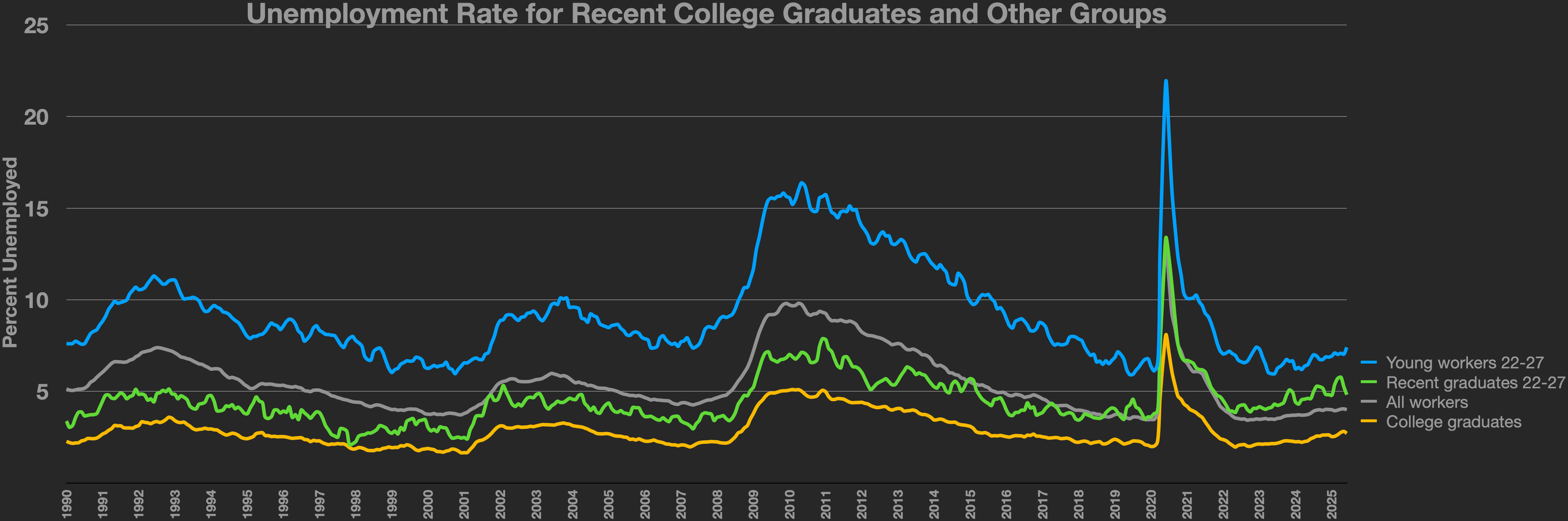
Unemployment rate for recent college graduates and other groups in the United States

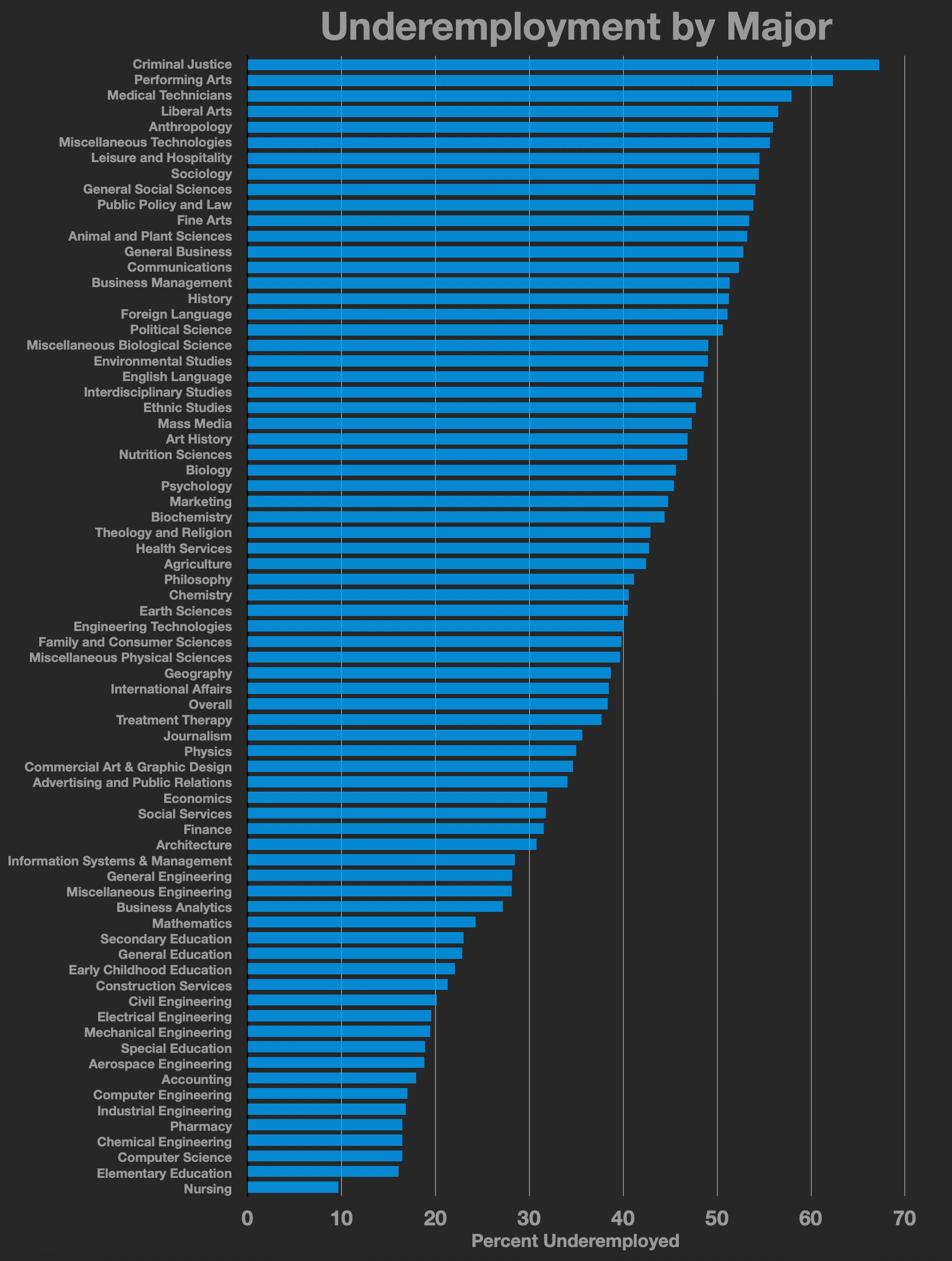
Underemployment by major in the United States

Graduate unemployment, or educated unemployment, is unemployment among people with an academic degree.

Aggravating factors for unemployment are the rapidly increasing quantity of international graduates competing for an inadequate number of suitable jobs, schools not keeping their curriculums relevant to the job market, the growing pressure on schools to increase access to education (which usually requires a reduction in educational quality), and students being constantly told that an academic degree is the only route to a secure future.

== Background ==
Research undertaken proved that unemployment and underemployment of graduates are devastating phenomena in their lives. A high incidence of either are indicators of institutional ineffectiveness and inefficiency. Since the beginning of the economic recession in the US economy in 2007, an increasing number of graduates have been unable to find permanent positions in their chosen field. According to statistics, the unemployment rate for recent college graduates has been higher than all college graduates in the past decade, implying that it has been more difficult for graduates to find a job in recent years. One year after graduation, the unemployment rate of 2007–2008 bachelor's degree recipients was 9%. Underemployment among graduates is high. Educated unemployment or underemployment is due to a mismatch between the aspirations of graduates and employment opportunities available to them.

=== Investment risk ===
College and Universities cost thousands of dollars a semester, not including study materials, books, room, and board. Tuition has gone up 1,120 percent in the last thirty years. Students have been given the impression that employers are looking for people who, through tests and grades, have demonstrated that they are high achievers. In many recent surveys, that has been proved otherwise. Employers are looking for people who have learned how to work well with others, and have gained substantial communication skills as well as critical thinking abilities. Graduates are not meeting employers needs. Students are also struggling to pay off their student loans. Without the desired, and needed, jobs graduates are accumulating debt and struggling to pay back their loans. 15 percent of the student borrowers default within the first three years of repayment. Many resort to returning to live with their parents and having to work multiple part-time jobs. Loans average about twenty to thirty thousand dollars. Higher education becomes an investment in which students are expecting to find a job with enough income to pay off the loans in a timely manner. It is an investment that students need to discern whether it will be beneficial or not, and whether it will help to advance their career in the long run.

== By country ==
=== United States ===
In June 2013, 11.8 million persons were unemployed, putting the unemployment rate at 7.6 percent. The state of the economy is a large contributor to these numbers. In June, 2001 the unemployment rate was 4.6% After 9/11/2001, the unemployment rate skyrocketed to 5.7% in November 2001 and rose drastically in 2009 to 10% in October. In September, 2015, unemployment is reported by the Labor Department to be at 5.1%. However, some economists dispute that as accurate and claim that unemployment is much higher due to the number of people who have stopped looking for jobs. The lack of jobs available, and skills desired by employers, are beginning to prove to be another major cause for graduate unemployment in the U.S. Graduates are completing school with a degree and a head full of knowledge, but still lack work experience to impress white-collar employers.

==== Educational attainment in the United States, Age 25 and Over (2009) ====
Educational Attainment	Percentage Attained
High school graduate	86.68%
Some college	55.60%
Associates and/or bachelor's degree	38.54%
Master's degree	7.62%
Doctorate or professional degree	2.94%

=== College majors sorted by employment rates, wages and graduate degrees ===
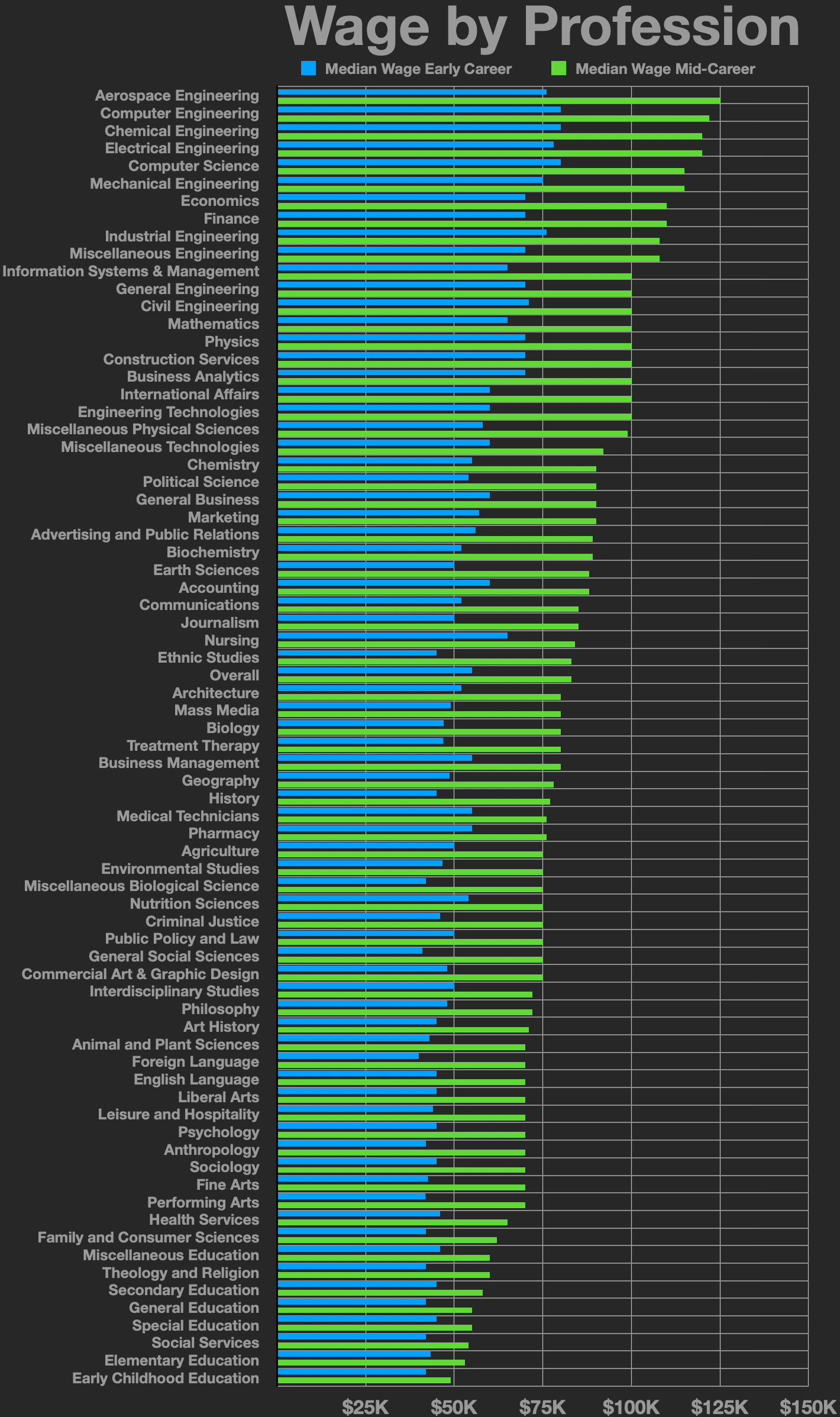
Wage by Profession

The table below lists data on the unemployment, underemployment, median wages, and graduate degrees of various fields of study, as reported by the Federal Reserve Bank of New York, the United States Census Bureau, and the American Community Survey, as of 2021. The unemployment, underemployment and early career figures are for recent college graduates (less than 28 years of age).

College Major	Unemployment rate	Underemployment rate	Median Wage Early Career	Median Wage Mid-Career	Share with Graduate Degree
Accounting	3.3%	22.6%	$54,000	$80,000	31.1%
Advertising and public relations	4.6%	39.2%	$50,000	$80,000	19.0%
Aerospace engineering	6.6%	27.7%	$72,000	$112,000	49.4%
Agriculture	2.4%	52.1%	$45,000	$70,000	21.0%
Animal and plant sciences	4.4%	52.5%	$42,000	$67,000	34.7%
Anthropology	6.5%	53.3%	$40,000	$65,000	46.3%
Architecture	2.1%	29.1%	$50,000	$85,000	38.7%
Art history	5.3%	48.8%	$48,000	$64,000	41.8%
Biochemistry	4.7%	37.4%	$45,000	$85,000	70.3%
Biology	4.7%	46.8%	$40,000	$75,000	62.9%
Business analytics	2.2%	24.8%	$66,000	$99,000	24.7%
Business management	5.0%	55.1%	$46,000	$75,000	24.6%
Chemical engineering	4.1%	19.6%	$75,000	$120,000	47.4%
Chemistry	3.4%	39.5%	$47,000	$85,000	65.4%
Civil engineering	3.4%	15.1%	$65,000	$100,000	38.6%
Commercial art and graphic design	7.9%	33.5%	$43,000	$70,000	11.8%
Communication studies	5.8%	52.7%	$47,000	$75,000	24.2%
Computer engineering	3.7%	17.8%	$74,000	$114,000	40.0%
Computer science	4.8%	19.1%	$73,000	$105,000	31.8%
Construction services	1.4%	17.7%	$60,000	$100,000	9.9%
Criminal justice	4.5%	71.3%	$43,900	$70,000	24.1%
Early childhood education	3.1%	24.5%	$40,000	$43,000	40.8%
Earth sciences	3.6%	38.8%	$40,000	$70,000	43.8%
Economics	5.5%	35.3%	$60,000	$100,000	42.6%
Electrical engineering	3.2%	15.4%	$70,000	$109,000	47.7%
Elementary education	1.8%	15.2%	$40,000	$48,000	49.0%
Engineering technologies	7.1%	39.6%	$62,000	$90,000	24.3%
English language	6.3%	48.7%	$40,000	$65,000	47.5%
Environmental studies	5.1%	50.2%	$45,000	$68,000	32.5%
Ethnic studies	4.4%	53.7%	$45,000	$66,000	49.7%
Family and consumer sciences	8.9%	47.9%	$37,000	$60,000	32.9%
Finance	4.1%	28.7%	$60,000	$100,000	30.6%
Fine arts	12.1%	55.4%	$40,000	$65,000	23.2%
Foreign language	7.8%	50.1%	$43,000	$65,000	50.5%
General business	5.3%	52.4%	$50,000	$80,000	25.2%
General education	1.8%	22.9%	$40,200	$51,000	50.1%
General engineering	5.9%	25.3%	$60,000	$100,000	37.0%
General social sciences	5.4%	50.6%	$43,000	$65,000	38.5%
Geography	4.4%	44.5%	$48,000	$75,000	32.6%
Health services	5.2%	45.6%	$40,000	$60,000	51.8%
History	5.8%	49.1%	$50,000	$70,000	50.2%
Industrial engineering	4.6%	18.3%	$70,000	$100,000	36.9%
Information systems and management	6.4%	24.7%	$54,000	$90,000	25.6%
Interdisciplinary studies	4.8%	46.3%	$41,800	$70,000	37.7%
International relations	7.1%	49.3%	$50,000	$86,000	45.6%
Journalism	6.5%	47.7%	$45,000	$75,000	27.0%
Leisure and hospitality	5.3%	58.6%	$38,000	$60,000	34.1%
Liberal arts	6.2%	55.2%	$40,000	$63,000	30.0%
Marketing	6.6%	52.0%	$50,000	$85,000	18.6%
Mass media	8.4%	51.7%	$40,000	$75,000	21.2%
Mathematics	5.8%	30.7%	$59,000	$88,000	52.4%
Mechanical engineering	5.3%	15.8%	$70,000	$105,000	39.2%
Medical technicians	5.8%	59.5%	$51,000	$71,000	24.6%
Miscellaneous biological sciences	6.3%	48.6%	$42,000	$70,000	60.9%
Miscellaneous education	0.6%	16.7%	$40,000	$56,000	56.6%
Miscellaneous engineering	3.4%	22.9%	$68,000	$100,000	45.8%
Miscellaneous physical sciences	5.5%	23.2%	$52,000	$104,000	57.1%
Miscellaneous technologies	5.9%	48.4%	$48,000	$80,000	18.5%
Nursing	1.3%	10.1%	$55,000	$75,000	29.3%
Nutrition sciences	1.8%	45.0%	$45,000	$60,000	46.3%
Performing arts	7.6%	64.0%	$39,000	$62,000	38.5%
Pharmacy	4.8%	14.7%	$55,000	$100,000	65.1%
Philosophy	9.1%	57.1%	$42,000	$68,000	56.5%
Physics	6.1%	34.9%	$53,000	$80,000	69.8%
Political science	6.9%	49.2%	$50,000	$80,000	53.6%
Psychology	4.7%	47.6%	$37,400	$65,000	51.0%
Public policy and law	7.4%	49.4%	$45,000	$70,000	46.1%
Secondary education	2.6%	27.0%	$40,400	$52,000	51.2%
Social services	3.0%	27.7%	$37,000	$52,000	52.4%
Sociology	9.0%	51.3%	$40,000	$61,000	38.3%
Special education	2.7%	17.7%	$40,000	$52,000	60.7%
Theology and religion	3.6%	35.5%	$36,000	$52,000	44.9%
Treatment therapy	5.7%	41.3%	$48,000	$69,000	50.7%
Overall	5.1%	39.8%	$50,000	$75,000	38.7%

=== Canada ===
A 2016 labour market assessment by the Parliamentary Budget Officer reported that the underemployment rate for undergraduates under the age of 35 increased from 32% in 1991 to 39% in 2015. The equivalent rate for college graduates was similar until 2006. Since then it has fallen to 33%.

A 2017 study from Statistics Canada showed that, for both men and women, more than 24% of undergraduates in the arts, the humanities, the social sciences and the behavioral sciences are underemployed. In nursing, engineering, education and training, and computer and information science, the underemployment rate is less than 8%.

A 2015 study from the Ontario Society of Professional Engineers found that approximately 2/3rds of Canadian engineering bachelor's degree holders were not employed as engineers or in occupations relating to engineering. With a substantial wage gap between those employed in engineering and those employed elsewhere.

=== Australia ===
A 2017 study by the Productivity Commission found that 20% of graduates are working part-time, while 26% of graduates are working full-time but consider themselves to be underemployed.

=== China ===
The markets for China's graduates share much in common with those of other countries. China's recent upsurge in graduate unemployment relates to a number of things. One important aspect is its education policy-making and economic development as well as reforms in the economy and in its higher education. Recently the annual growth in the numbers of new graduates was estimated at 7,270,000 for 2014. It has been stated that the rate of young unemployed graduates should logically bring about a withdrawal from higher education. At 8% annual growth, the Chinese labor market will generate about eight million jobs, but these are mainly in manufacturing and require low-level qualifications. This rising enrollment made employment an issue and a serious challenge for China. Including the graduates who are not employed last year, the number of unemployed graduates may reach 8,100,000. However, in the first half of 2014, there were 67,000 Chinese private businesses failing. These businesses employed 34.2 percent of the graduates in 2011.

In the study 2010 Chinese College Students Employment Report it named 15 professions that had the highest unemployment percentages in China. The survey said that, between 2007 and 2009, for three consecutive years, law majors had one of the highest unemployment rates for a bachelor's degree. Another field of high unemployment for the last three consecutive years was in the fields of computer science and technology. In many of China's universities, professions majoring in English have had a high level of unemployment This tendency was still occurring during 2010 to 2013.

==== Historical sketch ====
===== Education policy-making =====
From 1900 to 1911, China abolished the civil service examination system and established a modern schooling system based on Western models.

- In 1922 China adopted the American model, and this dominated the Chinese higher education system until 1949.
- In 1952 all of the higher education institutions were brought under the jurisdiction of the communist government, and the Soviet model was adopted to restructure China's higher education system in order to serve the manpower needs for building a socialist China.
- In 1958 China made its first attempt to expand the higher education sector by establishing more than 23,500 after-hours part work, part study colleges, in order to make an ambitious economic growth plan possible - the so-called Great Leap Forward for Socialist Construction.
- After 1978, with the end of the Cultural Revolution of 1966–76, China restored its higher education system and started educational reforms along with the move to a market-oriented socialist economy. In 1985 the central government announced its reform plan, and embarked upon a decentralization process which gave local government and higher education institutions more autonomy.
- In 1993 the government launched further reform measures to increase accessibility to higher education, and a "user-pay" system was implemented along with fundamental changes in the job assignment system.
- From 1993 to 1998, higher education developed on the basis of numbers being controlled and limited, and quality being improved. The unduly low proportion of students in the tertiary sector brought out the negative impact on Chinese economic growth.
- In 1998, the Declaration of the World Conference on Higher Education organized by UNESCO in Paris made the Chinese government aware that a rapid increase in the enrollment figures in higher education would be a way to respond to the needs of opening up and meeting the requirements of economic and social development.
- In 1999 the government decided to accelerate the pace of expansion, and enrollments in higher education institutions increased dramatically and continuously. The enrollment number in 1999 was 1,678,000 which increased 47% by 1998. In 2004 the number is 4,473,400 with the rate of 17.05% Student numbers climbed from 7.23 million in 2000 to 9.31 million in 2001 and 11.46 million in 2002. The figure in 2004 indicated almost four times as many enrollments as in 1998. And according to Limin Bai, the establishment of the elite universities project called "211", using large amounts of government funding, made it difficult for non-elite colleges to survive. This caused an increase in tuition fees and affected the quality of higher education, which in turn influenced the employment of graduates.

===== Economic development =====
Since 1978, the government has been reforming its economy from a Soviet-style centrally planned economy to a more market-oriented economy to increase productivity, living standards, and technological quality without exacerbating inflation, unemployment, and budget deficits.

China's economy regained momentum in the early 1990s. The Asian Financial Crisis of 1998–99 influenced the economy by slowing growth and as a consequence experts submitted proposals to state organs to stimulate economic recovery. This involved increasing student numbers and intensifying the modification of education as a way of stimulating internal consumption.

===== The unemployment rate of graduates =====
In 2008, the unemployment rate of graduates was more than 30%. In this year the unemployment rate of graduates from top universities was 10%.

In 2009, the employment rate of graduates who had bachelor's degree was in the 88% range.

In 2010, the employment rate of college graduates rose 3.2% in 2009 reaching 91.2%.

in 2012, Prime Minister Zhu warned that increased foreign competition brought by China's entry into the World Trade Organization could lead to a doubling of the official urban unemployment rate over the next few years from 3.5% to 7%, or around 30 million people.

In 2013, data released by the Chinese government indicated that the rate of graduate unemployment was 33.6%.

In 2014, based on official Chinese date, roughly 15% of the new grads are unemployed six months after graduation. However, Cheng, a professor of political science states the authentic unemployment is actually 2.3 million which means the rate is around 30%.

===== Summary =====
China's higher education system prior to the 1999 expansion was not prepared for large-scale growth as it was basically characterized as "education for examinations," and the reforms in the 1990s did not change this feature. The lack of diversity in curricula at different levels and in different divisions of higher education determined that graduates lacked the specialty and the flexibility to respond to market demand. Moreover, before the 1999 expansion, a national job market had not yet been established. With a focus on immediate economic growth, the policy makers appear to have made the 1999 expansion decision without a big picture of the future structure of China's market-oriented economy, and without knowing in which economic sectors manpower needs would increase.

===== Regional disparities =====
China has had a long history of regional disparities, and disparities between urban and rural areas. Disparities in economic development are paralleled by disparities in higher education: top universities, for instance, are all located in those regions such as Shanghai, Beijing and Shenzhen. Such disparities in education are reflected in both quality and quantity. In addition, Chinese Academy of Social Sciences Institute of Sociology and Social Sciences Documentation Publishing House jointly published the social blue book 2014 Chinese Social Situation Analysis and Prediction, which released a set of employment survey reports based on 1678 graduates from 12 universities. As is shown in the blue book, two months after graduation, the unemployment rate of undergraduates from rural families is higher than undergraduates from urban families, which is 30.5%.

===== Measures taken by the government to solve the problem =====
The Chinese government has taken some measures to try to solve the crisis and it hopes injecting huge investments into the economy will create jobs and relieve much of the pressure. But some experts predict that building infrastructure will only provide manual jobs for ordinary workers and will not benefit college graduates.

Another measure is to boost postgraduate enrollments. The Ministry of Education of the People's Republic of China plans to expand enrollments of masters students by 5% and doctoral students by 1.7%. Given the decline in jobs, many graduates will choose to study further and this year almost 1.25 million first degree-holders will be taking the postgraduate entrance examinations.

Yet expanding postgraduate enrollments cannot solve the problem of graduate unemployment as it can only offer some relief or postpone the current employment pressure. Indeed, in recent years, employment of master's degree graduates has become problematic. Diverting graduates to rural areas is a third measure. But a vast gap exists between urban and rural areas in terms of developmental level, opportunities, and living conditions. Thus, most graduates prefer to work in cities.

To encourage them to go to the countryside, the government has come up with policies such as preferential treatment when graduates (after two years service) apply to become government officials, or extra points are added to their scores in examinations for graduate study. But these policies are not attractive given the low salaries graduates earn in country areas.

The Ministry of Education of the People's Republic of China has recently been calling for the whole society, including overseas Chinese, to contribute ideas to improve education overall. Promoting creative and vocational education has been raised as a way of providing new graduates with creative education and job skills to meet the needs of the market and to face the challenges of a changing world in the decades to come.

Perhaps this approach constitutes a more fundamental strategy that will eventually solve the graduate employment problem, although the impact is likely to take many years to become apparent. China's education department has already stated clearly that it wants to turn 600 universities into polytechnics, in order to give students more technical and employment-related curriculum, instead of only providing academic and theoretical subjects.

===== Criticism of graduate unemployment =====
The employment situation for new college graduates is different from the working population in general. The graduate unemployment crisis in China represents a wasteful investment of scarce resources. Large sums of money have consequently been invested in educating unemployed graduates which could otherwise have been invested in job-creating productive programmes. With a flood of new graduates, individuals are having a tough time finding jobs in an increasingly competitive labor market. Furthermore， it produces permanent scars on youth. Farlie and Kletzer (1999) estimated that being unemployed while young results in lower future earnings by a magnitude of 8.4% and 13.0% for males and females, respectively. Meanwhile, graduates have some negative expectations under the pressure of seeking jobs. Nanjing Normal University has surveyed students who expected to graduate in 2006 about "College Student's Attitudes about Job Seeking and Career". 44.21% prefer to get an employment contract first, then consider pursuing a new job position which is what they really desire to be employed for an average of 2 years. This phenomenon not only causes underemployment and high turnover in the job market, but also, graduates will have lower levels of job satisfaction, work commitment, job involvement and internal work motivation. Obviously, these of problems will bring more risks for employers as well.

Another widespread criticism is that, since the acceleration of enrollment starting from 1999, many schools, which were originally vocational ones, have been turned into universities. This has resulted in the number of universities increasing greatly, which also means an increase in graduates with university degrees. But the truth is that the quality of these students' education is often even lower than vocational school graduates. The reason is that vocational school graduates have technical abilities which university graduates often lack. It's quite common that universities often put more emphasis on academic research rather than teaching practical skills required for jobs, which employers often value. What is more, some employers only pay attention to graduates from prestigious universities, which result in the decrease of competences of normal college graduates. In order to solve this, it is said that the Chinese government is considering restoring these so-called Sanben universities to what they originally were.

===== Responses to criticism =====
Graduate unemployment will be more likely to promote educational inflation. Half of graduates would like to consider attending postgraduate schools to enhance their ability to seek expert jobs. Government interventions are designed to alleviate graduate unemployment by encouraging young job seekers to "Go west, go down to where motherland and people are in greatest need."

The China Youth Daily has reported that some graduates have worked for years in villages of Hainan, China's most southerly province. In 2003, the Communist Youth League recruited over 50,000 graduates to provide volunteer service in education, health care, agriculture, and cultural development in western provinces. As well as receiving a stipend, a State Council circular issued in 2005 promised the graduate volunteers preferential policies in civil service tests and graduate school entrance exams. Moreover, graduates had an opportunity to be self-employed as the Chinese government launched policies which were formulated to encourage college graduates to carve out their own future. However, many college graduates remain underemployed or unemployed even after completing their advanced degree.

=== United Kingdom ===
A study in 2018 from the Higher Education Careers Service Unit has found a wide range, six months after acquiring their first degree, in the proportion of graduates who are either in full-time employment or studying for an advanced degree. There is also a wide range in the proportion of these graduates who are employed in occupations such as cashier or waiter. The following table shows selected data from this study.

Subject	Percentage working full-time in the UK	Percentage engaged in further study	Percentage working in retail, catering, waiting, or as bar staff
All first-degree graduates	55.2	16.1	10.4
Economics	58.0	15.2	6.2
Finance and accountancy	60.6	9.2	6.3
Management and business studies	62.4	9.8	9.8
Hospitality, leisure, tourism and transport	61.8	6.9	13.5
Marketing	70.7	6.1	11.1
Fine arts	36.4	14.4	24.2
Design	56.8	5.9	16.9
Media studies	50.8	10.7	21.1
Performing arts	41.8	14.4	20.6
Cinematics and photography	49.3	7.0	19.7
Information technology	64.0	10.3	7.3
Mathematics	47.6	25.0	8.5
Architecture and construction management	70.3	7.3	4.4
Civil engineering	69.3	12.4	4.2
Electrical engineering and electronic engineering	66.6	12.2	6.2
Mechanical engineering	63.9	13.5	5.7
English studies	40.1	24.7	19.2
History	39.6	27.5	18.5
Languages	42.1	21.0	14.4
Philosophy	40.4	24.8	16.1
Biology	35.5	33.4	19.4
Chemistry	42.8	33.2	11.9
Physical and geographical sciences	44.2	26.1	16.0
Physics	38.3	36.9	9.3
Sports science	42.9	21.8	14.0
Geography	46.1	23.0	16.4
Law	38.0	32.8	13.4
Psychology	40.7	22.7	15.9
Sociology	45.9	20.0	21.6
Political science	45.6	24.4	12.9

=== Europe ===
According to a 2002 survey of more than 30,000 graduates from 10 European countries about 3–4 years after graduation, only a minority of 10–20% of graduates face substantial problems in the labor market or end up in positions not commensurate with their level of education. There is a clear north–south differential in Europe with respect to transition and objective employment measures, while the pattern is more differentiated with respect to the perceived utilisation of knowledge, the self-rated adequacy of position and the job satisfaction.

Among OECD nations in 2013, the worst unemployment rates for graduates were in by Greece, Spain and Portugal.

== See also ==
- Mickey Mouse degree
- Overqualification
- Underemployment
