= Higher education financing issues in the United States =

Cost and financial issues in education beyond high school

The inflation-adjusted cost of U.S. higher education has more than doubled in fifty years.

Financial issues facing students in the United States include the rising cost of tuition, as well as ancillaries, such as room and board, textbook and coursework costs, personal expenses, and transportation.

After adjusting for inflation, average published tuition at public (4-year, in-state) and private non-profit universities has increased by 178% and 98%, respectively, from the 1990–91 school year to 2017–18. Net Price (tuition less aid received) has also grown, but to a much smaller degree, as most universities have increased their "discount rate" by offering more in student aid. After adjusting for inflation, average net price at public and private universities has increased by 77% and 17%, respectively, over the same time frame.

== The rising cost of education in the US ==
The cost of higher education in the US has been rising.

=== Cost of instruction ===
One explanation posits that tuition increases simply reflect the increasing costs of producing higher education due to its high dependence upon skilled labor. According to the theory of the Baumol effect, a general economic trend is that productivity in service industries has lagged that in goods-producing industries, and the increase in higher education costs is simply a reflection of this phenomenon. For example, under this theory, on an inflation-adjusted basis, the cost of manufactured goods, such as chalkboards and paper, will generally go down as factories become more efficient, but the cost of services, such as teaching, tutoring, and coaching, will go up.

Some universities describe being caught in a dilemma where they are pressured to offer broader curricula and improve facilities to attract new students on one hand, but on the other hand these universities must raise tuition to compensate for state spending cuts and rising expenses.

Annual undergraduate tuition varies widely from state to state, and many additional fees apply. Listed tuition prices generally reflect the upper bound that a student may be charged for tuition. In many cases, the "list price" of tuition – that is, the tuition rate broadcast on a particular institution's marketing platforms – may turn out to be different from the actual (or net) tuition charged per student. A student that has applied for institution-based funding will know his or her net tuition upon receipt of a financial aid package.

In 2023–2024, weighted average list price for annual tuition and fees at a four-year public university (for residents of the state) was $11,260. Tuition for public school students from outside the state is generally comparable to private school prices, although students can often qualify for state residency after their first year. Private schools are typically much higher, although prices vary widely from "no-frills" private schools to highly specialized technical institutes. In 2023–2024 school year, private schools had an average list price of $41,540 for tuition and fees. Depending upon the type of school and program, annual graduate program tuition can vary from $15,000 to as high as $50,000.

=== Cost of textbooks ===
Another issue is the rising cost of textbooks. There are textbook exchanges for students who will accept a used text at a lower price. Lower priced alternatives offered by Flat World Knowledge are now available but have yet to make a significant impact on overall textbook prices.

=== Increased amenities ===
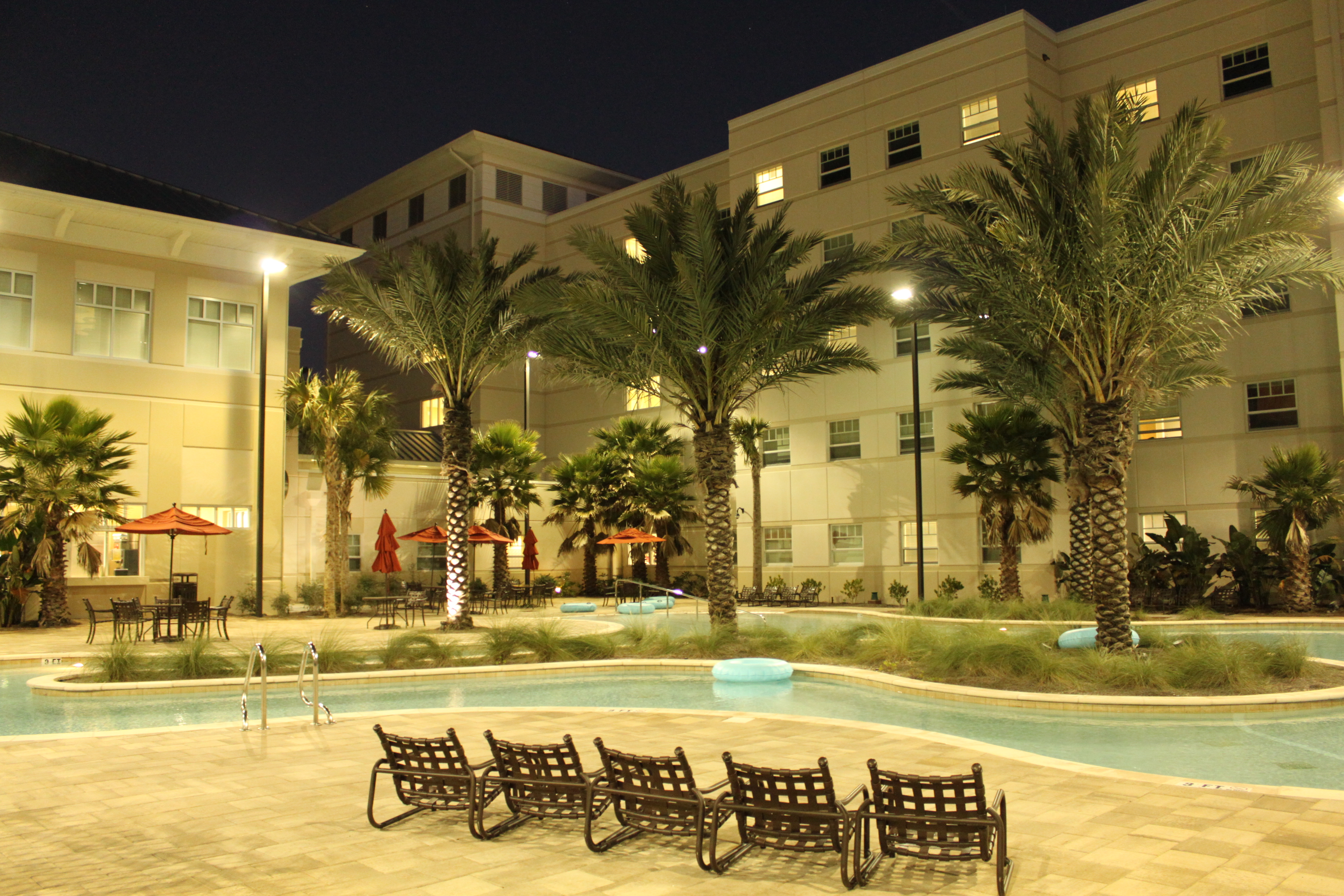
Amenities such as a lazy river at a dorm at the University of North Florida are reputed to be driving up costs for undergraduate education.

A report in The Economist criticized American universities for generally losing sight of how to contain costs. Analyst Jeffrey Selingo in The Chronicle of Higher Education blamed rising costs on unnecessary amenities such as private residence rooms, luxury dining facilities, climbing walls, and sometimes even so-called lazy rivers similar to ones found in amusement parks.

=== Cost of going away to school ===
If schools can be criticized for adding some expensive amenities, families are also making choices that drive up the costs. They may see going away to college as a rite of passage or an opportunity for emotional development that is worth the additional cost. They may also choose to attend a private school or an out-of-state public school, which cost significantly more.

For most students in the US, the cost of living away from home, whether in a dorm room or by renting an apartment, would exceed the cost of tuition and fees. In the 2023–2024 school year, living on campus (room and board) usually cost about $12,000 to $15,000 per student.

== Paying for college ==
=== Issues related to financial aid ===
The portion of state budget funding spent on higher education decreased by 40% from 1978 to 2011, while most tuition fees significantly increased over the same period. Between 2000 and 2010, the cost of tuition and room and board at public universities increased by 37%. There is a misconception that there was no similar increase in financial aid to help cover the costs of tuition. This is incorrect. In 1965, $558 million was available for financial aid. In 2005 more than $129 billion was available. As college costs have risen, so has the amount of money available to finance a college education. However, the proportion of gift aid and self-help funding has shifted: loans and work make up a larger percentage of aid packages. During the early 1980s, higher education funding shifted from reliance on state and federal government funding to more family contributions and student loans. Pell Grants, which were created to offset the cost of college for low-income students, started funding more middle-class students, stretching the funds thinner for everyone. During the mid-1990s 34% of the cost for college was covered by the maximum offered Pell Grant, compared to 84% during the 1970s.

During Clinton's presidency, funding for higher education focused on creating tax benefits tied to attending college. These policies put less emphasis on developing grants to allow students to attend college. Some argued that this approach did not adequately provide aid to those students most in need. There was also a fear that tax deductions or credits would drive up tuition costs.

The federal government also began funding fewer grant programs and more loan programs, leaving students with higher amounts of debt. In 2003, almost 70% of federal student aid awarded was student loans, which was a much higher percentage than just a decade prior. The National Center for Education Statistics reported that during the 2007–08 school year, 66% of degree recipients borrowed money to complete their degree; 36% of these graduates had to borrow from state or private sources, averaging total loan amounts of $13,900; 95% of these loans were private. On average, a student borrowed $24,700 during the 2007–08 school year. One estimate of total debt of all ex-students in 2011 was $1 trillion. The economic troubles of the recent decade left higher education funding shifted toward other needs because higher education institutions can gain extra funds through raising tuition and private donations.

Policy changes in higher education funding raise questions about the impact on student performance and access to higher education. Early studies focused on social integration and a person's individual attributes as the factors for degree completion. More recent studies have begun to look at larger factors including state funding and financial support. It has been found that providing need-based aid proved to increase degree completion in 48 states. There has also been a positive correlation between providing merit-based aid and degree completion. As the level to qualify for state need-based aid is lowered, the probability of persistence increases. Low-income families now must pay more to attend college, making it harder for them to attain higher education. In 1980, low-income families used 13% of their income to pay for one year of college. In 2000, this proportion grew to 25 percent of their income, while high-income families used less than 5% of their income. Fully understanding how need and merit (non-need) aid is determined is critical to ensure greater access to higher education. It is clear that at both private and public colleges and universities family income has a major impact on need-based financial aid. As colleges and universities compete for students, the demarcation between merit-based aid and need-based aid is less clear. While there has been a traditional distinction between need-based and merit-based funding, recent trends indicate that these two categories are more blurred than their labels would suggest. Research confirms that merit-based financial aid often takes into account student need and vice versa.

Controversy has also risen regarding performance-based funding. Performance-based funding is a system in which the state's higher education budget is allocated to institutions by several measures to best determine allocation of funds. This system has been criticized due to the complexity of the measurements as well as the resulting changed environment and goals of campuses. Many have criticized performance-funding, noting an overemphasis of test scores without consideration of other possible measures.

A 2006 report by Michael S. McPherson and Morton Owen Schapiro indicated that financial aid to students in the 1990s held the strongest correlation with student SAT scores. The report was conducted in the interest of looking directly at the relationship between financial aid grants and various factors, with specific focus on the variables of family income level and SAT scores and minor focus on personal variables, such as race and gender. The reason these factors were given greater consideration was that, according to McPherson and Schapiro, the information was readily available and led to a more meaningful comparison across students than variables like high school GPA. The report also made clear that it ignored the distinctions that universities make between "need-based" and "merit-based" aid. McPherson and Schapiro argued, "Although it is commonplace to track the importance of merit as opposed to need-based aid based on the responses given by college and university administrators on survey forms, we have argued that the distinction between 'need-based' and 'non-need-based' student grants is a slippery one." The findings in the report indicated that "the principle of awarding financial aid strictly in relation to ability to pay is becoming an increasingly less important factor in the distribution of aid in America's private colleges and universities."

Some low-income students have to work and study at the same time. This may adversely impact their performance in school.

Most discussions on how higher education funding is determined have focused on the economic and demographic influences; however, according to a 2010 study on the relationship between politics and state funding, political factors influence higher education funding. First, as the number of interest groups for higher education in a state grows, so does the amount of money given to higher education. Second, states with a more liberal political ideology give more funding to higher education. Third, governors with more control over the state budget tend to award less money to higher education. Fourth, a more professional state legislature correlates with more funding for higher education. (Professional in here refers to a legislature that acts much as the U.S. Congress does in that members have many staff members and spend more time in session.) Fifth, the more diverse a state population becomes, the less support there will be for higher education funding.

=== When college does not pay off ===
One view is that college students go to college to develop skills for a lucrative career. In 2018, however, more than half of institutions left the majority of their students earning less than $28,000—the typical salary of a high school graduate. Schools with limited job placement programs, career counseling, and internships are more likely to have limited returns.

Forty-two percent of parents revealed that paying their children’s student loans or funding their tuition made saving difficult, according to a survey conducted in 2023. Paying for college can hurt retirement outcomes for parents of college students. In a Barron's article titled "How Your Kids Can Ruin Your Retirement — and How to Make Sure They Don't", Reshma Kapadia offers advice to parents on how they can ensure that higher education for their children does not result in diminished retirement quality.

According to a 2019 Fed survey, "two-thirds of graduates with a bachelor's degree or more believed that their educational investment had paid off financially, but only 3 in 10 of those who started but did not complete a degree shared this view."

=== For-profit schools ===
From 1972 to 2009, there was rapid growth of for-profit schools. Government funding in 1972 and government deregulation in 1998 fueled a dramatic rise in for-profit college enrollment. Government oversight and scrutiny since 2010 as well as competition from non-profit and public education has led to a dramatic decrease in enrollment.

At its peak, The University of Phoenix was the largest U.S. for-profit college, with an enrollment of more than 500,000 students nationwide. Other large institutions included Devry University, ITT Technical Institute, the Art Institutes, Kaplan University, Ashford University, Colorado Technical Institute, Strayer University, Lincoln Tech, and Walden University.

Altogether, at their peak, for-profit colleges enrolled about 11% of the students but created approximately 47% of all the student loan defaults.

Critics of for-profit colleges have pointed to the heavy dependence on federal loans and grants to students, the low student completion rate, and the inability of the majority of graduates to pay their student loans because they failed to secure high-paying jobs.

The National Center for Education Statistics reported a 52% rate of default on student loans at for-profit colleges.

=== Student loan debt ===
The amount of debt that students have after graduation has become a major concern, especially given the weak job market after 2008. Nearly all loans are financed by the federal government at an artificially low rate, but students sometimes obtain private loans (which generally have higher interest rates and start accumulating interest immediately).

Several studies and news reports have detailed the effects of student loan debt on reducing first time home buying and child bearing—and ultimately slowing down the U.S. economy. Some students have turned to prostitution to avoid college debt.

In 2010, the U.S. Department of Education announced stricter eligibility rules for federal financing of loans to student at for-profit schools, which were experiencing higher default rates. Student loans totaled more than $1.3 trillion, averaging $25,000 each for 40 million debtors. The debtors average age was 33. Forty percent of the debt was owed by people 40 or older.

In a 2017 report by the National Center for Education Statistics, the researchers found that 27% of all student loans resulted in default within 12 years. Children in poor families were particularly vulnerable, still maintaining an average balance that was 91% of the original loan.

In 2018, a poll by Lake Research Partners and Chesapeake Beach Consulting found "an overwhelming concern among voters regarding the level of student debt."

The most visible student loan resistance groups in the U.S. are the Strike Debt Debt Collective and Student Loan Justice.

== Changes in taxpayer support ==
Study comparing college revenue per student by tuition and state funding in 2008 dollars.

College costs are rising while state appropriations for aid are shrinking. This has led to debate over funding at both the state and local levels. From 2002 to 2004 alone, tuition rates at public schools increased by just over 14%, largely due to dwindling state funding. A more moderate increase of 6% occurred over the same period for private schools. Between 1982 and 2007, college tuition and fees rose three times as fast as median family income, in constant dollars. In the 2012 fiscal year, state and local financing declined to $81.2 billion, a drop in funding compared to record-high funding in 2008 of $88 billion in a pre-recession economy.

Athletics have been increasingly subsidized by tuition. Fewer than one in eight of the 202 NCAA Division I colleges netted more money than they spent on athletics between 2005 and 2010. At the few money-making schools, football and sometimes basketball sales support the school's other athletic programs. Athletes, on average, cost six times what it cost to educate the non-athlete. Spending per student varied from $10,012 to $19,225; while the spending per athlete varied from $41,796 to $163,931.

== Controlling costs ==
To combat costs colleges have hired adjunct professors to teach. In 2008 these teachers cost about $1,800 per 3-credit class as opposed to $8,000 per class for a tenured professor. Two-thirds of college instructors were adjuncts, according to one estimate; a second estimate from NBC News in 2013 was that 76% of college professors were in "low-paying, part-time jobs or insecure, non-tenure positions," often lacking health insurance. There are differences of opinion on whether these adjuncts teach more or less effectively than regular tenured or tenure-track professors. There is some suspicion that student evaluation of adjuncts, along with doubts on the part of teachers about subsequent continued employment, can lead to grade inflation.

== Effects of rising costs ==
Although tuition costs have risen, the rising costs have had little effect on transfer rates and overall enrollment. In a study on effects of rising tuition costs, analysis revealed that the rising costs of colleges have "weak or no effects" on enrollment. Rising tuition costs have not deterred enrollment "as long as students believe the potential return of a college education is much greater than the cost".

Princeton sociologists Thomas Espenshade and Alexandria Walton Radford published a book-length study of admissions that found that an upper-middle-class white applicant was three times as likely to be admitted to an American college as a lower-class white with similar qualification. New York Times columnist Ross Douthat has cited this as an example of how U.S. universities can exacerbate wealth inequality. A 2006 report by Future of Children, a collaboration of Princeton and the Brookings Institution, concluded that "the current process of admission to, enrollment in, and graduation from colleges and universities contributes to economic inequality as measured by income and wealth." According to Suzanne Mettler of Cornell, government policy towards higher education has an effect of deepening inequality and disadvantaging students from the lower classes.
