= Campus climate =

Higher education construct

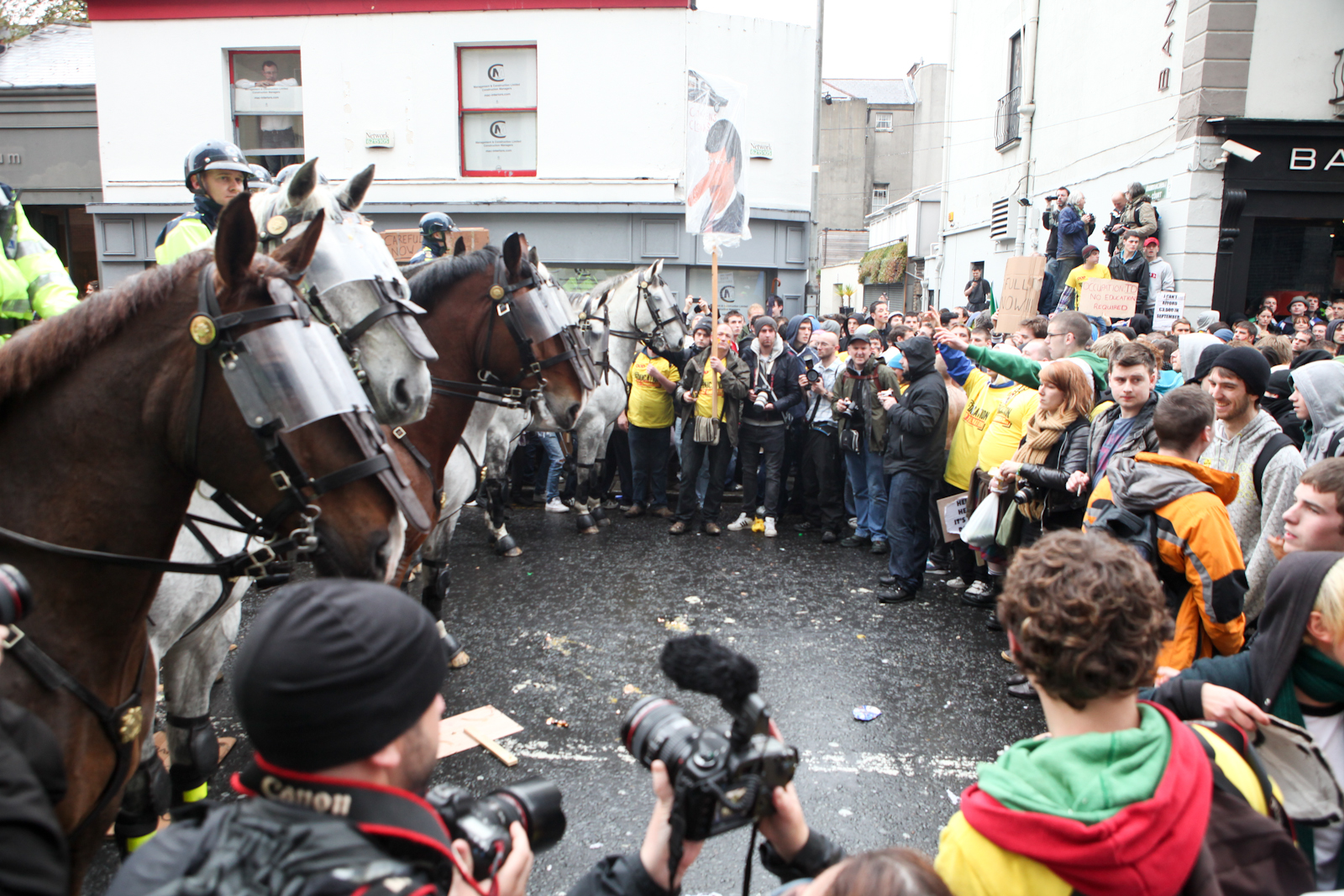
Police confront protesters during the 2010 student protest in Dublin

Campus climate refers to current dimensions of climate in the campus community in higher education institutions. According to one definition offered by Jeni Hart and Jennifer Fellabaum, the dimensions of climate could refer to views, attitudes, psychology, behaviors, standards, perceptions and expectations. Campus community could refer to employees such as faculty, staff, administrators, and students, individually or as a group. Campus climate is often contrasted with campus culture. While climate and culture are sometimes used interchangeably, some authors mention overlaps while others define clear boundaries between the two.

== Definitions and descriptions ==
Huston Smith (1955) wrote that the "atmosphere" and "environment" of a college affects everyone that is a part of it, making an educational institute more than a group of students, employees and buildings. Early attempts at measuring campus climate (culture, atmosphere, environment) include assessments and indexes created by John L. Holland & Alexander Astin (1961), and George G. Stern & C. Robert Pace (1962). More recently, climate has been understood to represent an "immeasurable construct". Hart & Fellabaum (2008) studied 118 campus climate papers and identified a number of definitions and measurement efforts.

The major features of climate are (1) its primary emphasis on common participant views of a wide array of organizational phenomena that allow for comparison among groups or over time, (2) its focus on current patterns of beliefs and behaviors, and (3) its often ephemeral or malleable character

— Peterson & Spencer (1990),

The collective, mutually shaping patterns of institutional history, mission, physical settings, norms, traditions, values, practices, beliefs, and assumptions that guide the behavior of individuals and groups in an institution of higher education which provide a frame of reference for interpreting the meanings of events and actions on and off campus

— Kuh & Hall (1993),

The current attitudes, behaviors, and standards and practices of employees and students of an institution [...] that concern the access for, inclusion of, and level of respect for individual and group needs, abilities, and potential

— Rankin & Reason (2008),

Climate is a broad concept however often used in a narrower and more concentrated manner. Conceptual framework for campus climate has developed to include the history of the educational institute, capacity to handle diversity, and psychological and behavioral climate.

== Faculty role in campus climate ==
Women colleges and universities around the world provide a friendly and "warm" to "neutral" climate. Campus climate at women's colleges for female faculty is more conducive than at coeducational institutions. The climate situation in coeducational settings for female faculty is similar to the situation for female students, say with regard to male privilege. Intellectual inbreeding in China, Japan and Korea is affected by the old boy networks; in this respect women colleges and universities provide opportunities which coeducational institutions do not.

== Research from around the world ==
=== Campus climate in Brazil ===
A study conducted at Federal University of Bahia observed that a number of campus climate variables affected students in general, and more importantly variables that went on to affect their interaction with their academic life and retention. This includes identity, teaching and faculty interactions.

=== Campus climate in India ===
One of the first studies in India which included the aspect of campus climate was conducted in the University of Pune from 2013 onwards. The study found that faculty demographics and student demographics has changed unequally and this has a significant factor of campus climate. The study also revealed changing gender patterns which also have implications for campus climate. Changes in the gender gap include increased access to higher education for women from "relatively privileged backgrounds" and males from "disadvantaged backgrounds". This kind of changing social dynamic has resulted in observations such as men reporting experiencing more discrimination than women. Low empathy, low tolerance and low argumentation skills were observed.

=== Campus climate in Turkey ===
Gunuc & Artun et al. (2019) conducted a campus climate study of 26 universities in Turkey covering all the geographic regions of the country. The study found that the correlation between student engagement and campus climate along with certain other variables was significant.

=== Campus climate in United States ===
Climate for free speech in US campuses has been studied. More than half of college students self-censor themselves and there is a large variation between institutions with regard to free speech. There is a discussion about cancel culture and wokeness on the left. Campus climate is an important factor that affects decisions to seek out mental health services for mental health issues.

== See also ==
- Organisation climate
- University student retention
- Learning community
