= Textbook exchange =

A textbook exchange is the selling or trading of textbooks used from a previous college semester to students needing that textbook for the current semester. It is primarily aimed to fight the rising cost of college books. Exchanges may be made at the college bookstore or through a website.
