= FAFSA position =

Former practice that colleges could see other colleges to which a student applied

The FAFSA position is a historical term in college admissions in the United States that referred to the position where a prospective college appeared on an applicant's FAFSA form. FAFSA permits an applicant to list up to ten colleges on the form, and the entire list was historically sent to each college. As a result, admissions officers could see any other colleges to which a student was applying and the order in which the colleges were listed.

The US Department of Education changed the FAFSA for the 2016–2017 academic year to prevent schools from viewing other schools that may be listed on the application. A higher FAFSA position had been interpreted by admissions officials and enrollment consultants as a sign of greater interest. Accordingly, a college's FAFSA position may have affected whether a student was offered admission to the college, waitlisted, or how much financial aid was offered. One report suggested that the importance of the FAFSA position as a factor signifying greater demonstrated interest was exaggerated.

Advisers suggested that applicants list colleges alphabetically to obscure any preferences. There had been calls for the Department of Education to stop releasing data about other colleges as a matter of privacy or to alphabetize the list automatically.

== See also ==
- FAFSA
- College admissions in the United States
- Transfer admissions in the United States
- Wait list (college admissions)
- Yield (college admissions)
