= College admissions in the United States =

Aspect of education

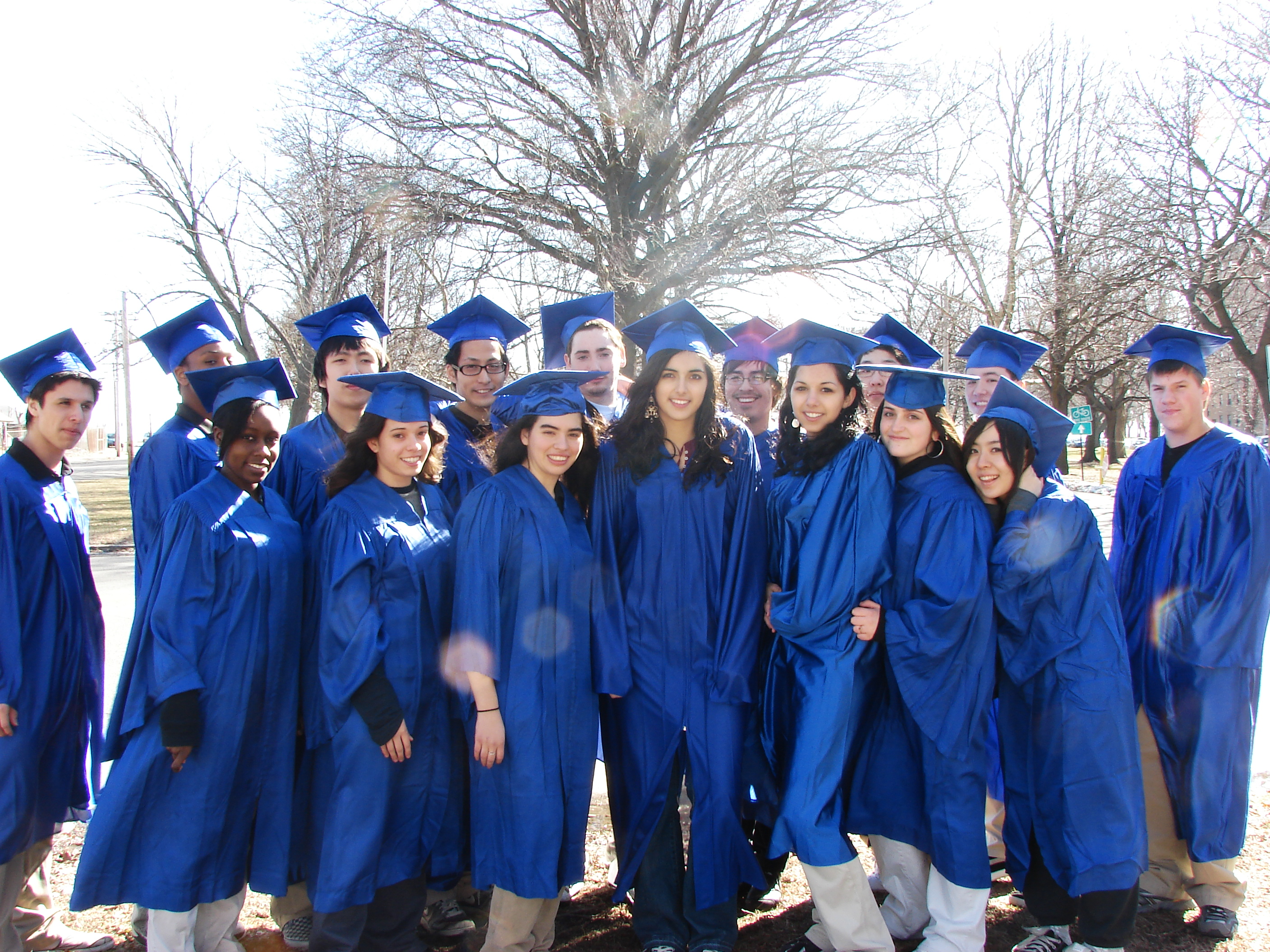
Graduates from a high school in Connecticut in 2008

College admissions in the United States is the process of applying for undergraduate study at colleges or universities. For students entering college directly after high school, the process typically begins in eleventh grade, with most applications submitted during twelfth grade. Deadlines vary, with Early Decision or Early Action applications often due in October or November, and regular decision applications in December or January. Students at competitive high schools may start earlier, and adults or transfer students also apply to colleges in significant numbers.

Each year, millions of high school students apply to college. In 2018–19, there were approximately 3.68 million high school graduates, including 3.33 million from public schools and 0.35 million from private schools. The number of first-time freshmen entering college that fall was 2.90 million, including students at four-year public (1.29 million) and private (0.59 million) institutions, as well as two-year public (0.95 million) and private (0.05 million) colleges. First-time freshman enrollment is projected to rise to 2.96 million by 2028.

Students can apply to multiple schools and file separate applications to each school. Recent developments such as electronic filing via the Common Application, now used by about 800 schools and handling 25 million applications, have facilitated an increase in the number of applications per student. Around 80 percent of applications were submitted online in 2009. About a quarter of applicants apply to seven or more schools, paying an average of $40 per application. Most undergraduate institutions admit students to the entire college as "undeclared" undergraduates and not to a particular department or major, unlike many European universities and American graduate schools, although some undergraduate programs may require a separate application at some universities. Admissions to two-year colleges or community colleges are simpler, often requiring only a high school transcript and in some cases, minimum test score.

Recent trends in college admissions include increased numbers of applications, increased interest by students in foreign countries in applying to American universities, more students applying by an early method, applications submitted by Internet-based methods including the Common Application and Coalition for College, increased use of consultants, guidebooks, and rankings, and increased use by colleges of waitlists. In the early 2000s, there was an increase in media attention focused on the fairness and equity in the college admission process. The increase of highly sophisticated software platforms, artificial intelligence and enrollment modeling that maximizes tuition revenue has challenged previously held assumptions about exactly how the applicant selection process works. These trends have made college admissions a very competitive process, and a stressful one for students, parents and college counselors alike, while colleges are competing for higher rankings, lower admission rates and higher yield rates to boost their prestige and desirability. Admission to U.S. colleges in the aggregate level has become more competitive, however, most colleges admit a majority of those who apply. The selectivity and extreme competition has been very focused in a handful of the most selective colleges.

== Participants ==
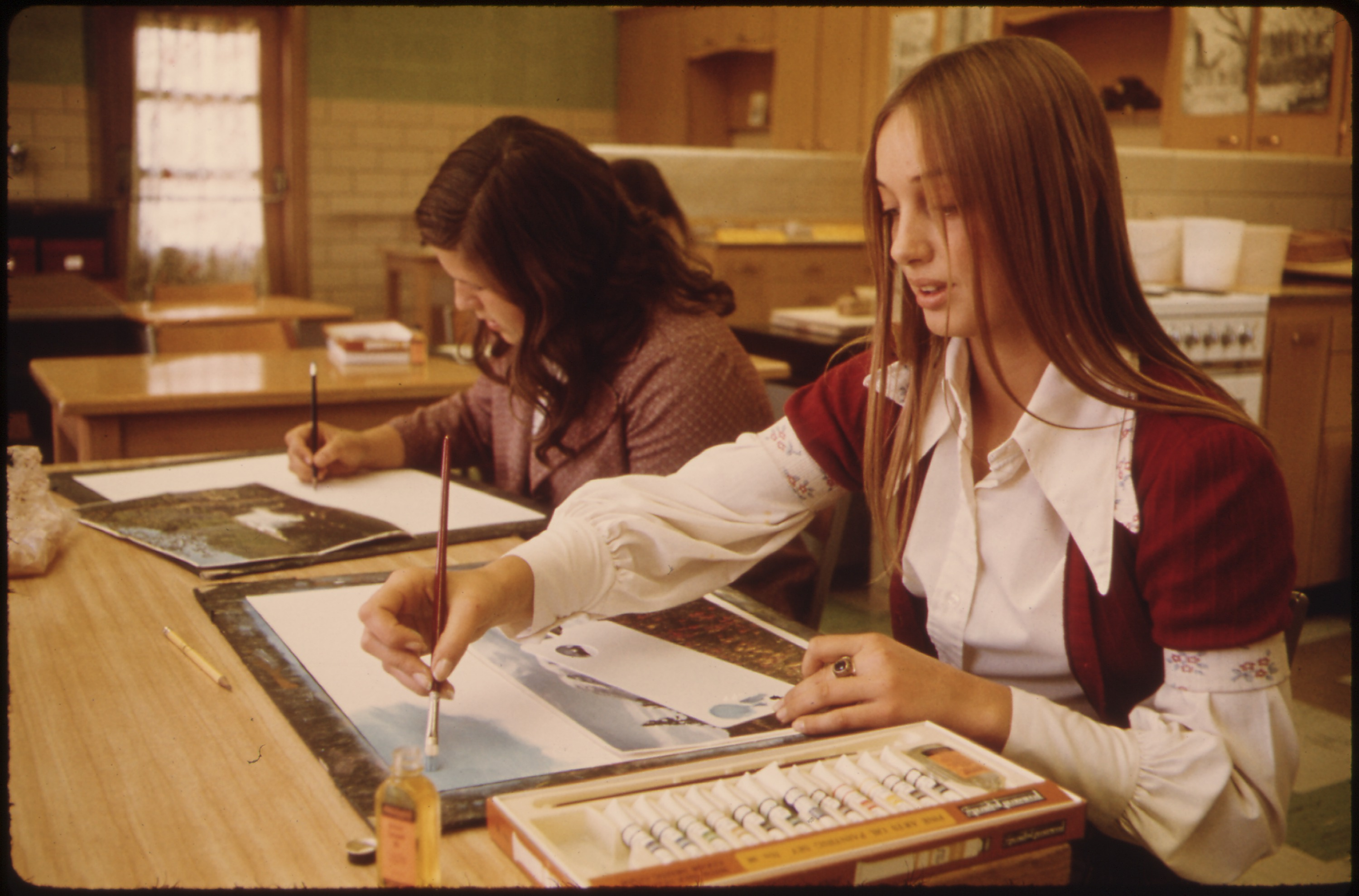
High school art students in Minnesota

=== Students ===
Applying to colleges can be stressful. The outcome of the admission process may affect a student's life and career trajectory considerably. Entrance into top colleges is increasingly competitive, and many students feel immense pressure during their high school years.

Private and affluent public primary education, test-prep courses, 'enrichment' programmes, volunteer service projects, international travel, music lessons, sports activities – all the high-cost building blocks of the perfect college application – put crushing pressure on the upper middle class and their offspring.

— Yale professor William Deresiewicz, quoted in BBC News about his article in The New Republic, 2014

=== Parents ===
The college applications process can be stressful for parents of teenagers, according to journalist Andrew Ferguson, since it exposes "our vanities, our social ambitions and class insecurities, and most profoundly our love and hopes for our children".

=== High school counselors ===
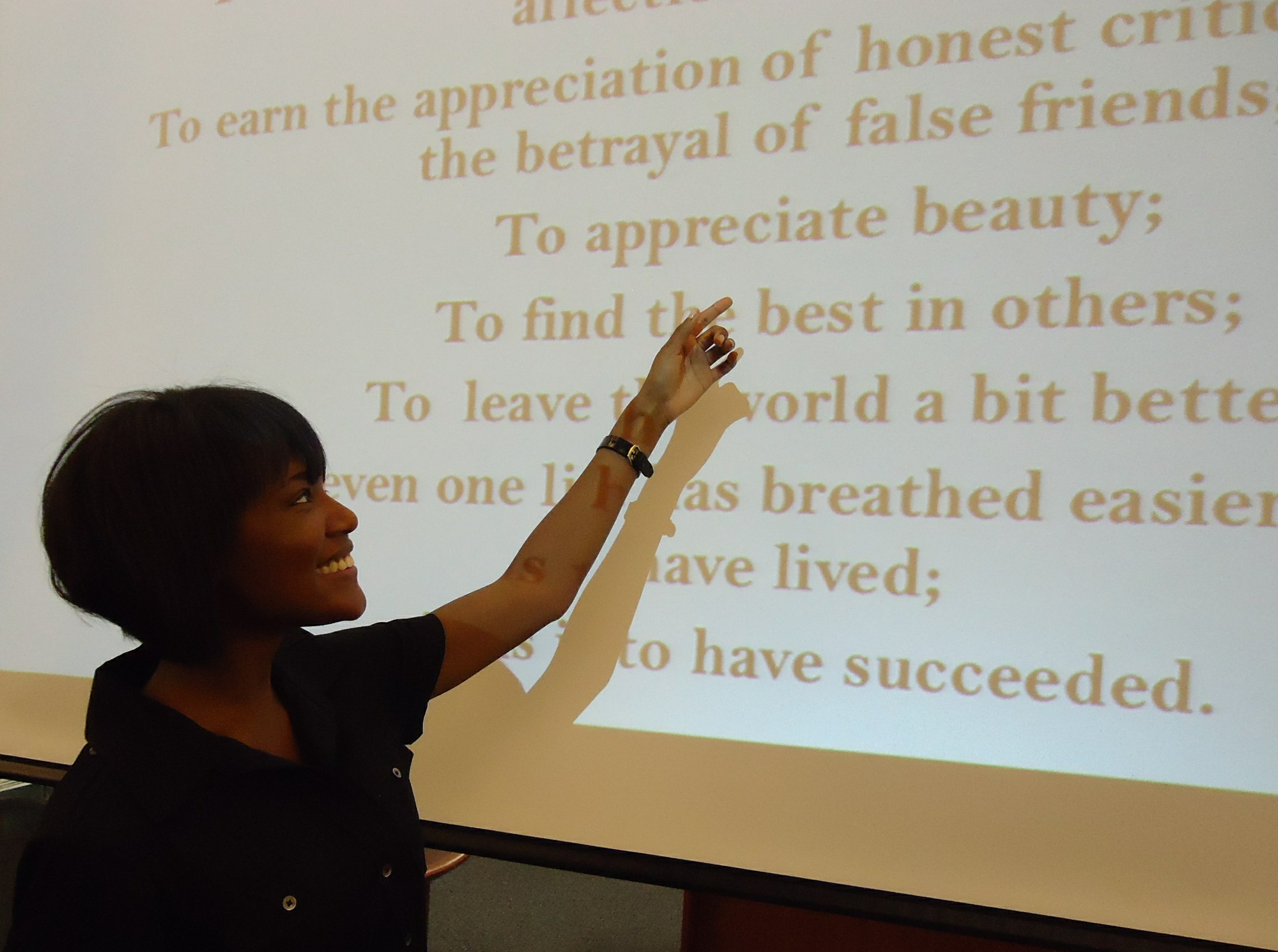
High school advisors can help parents understand aspects of the college admissions process.

Some high schools have one or more teachers experienced in offering counseling to college-bound students in their junior and senior years. Parents often meet with the school counselor during the process together with the student. Advisors recommend that students get to know their school counselor. The counselor usually works in conjunction with the guidance department which assists students in planning their high school academic path.

School counselors are in contact with colleges year after year and can be helpful in suggesting suitable colleges for a student. Mamlet and VanDeVelde suggest that it is improper for an admissions counselor to tamper with a student's "authentic self". According to their view, ideal counselors have experience with college admissions, meet regularly with college admissions officers, and belong to professional organizations. Counselors do not complete interviews, write essays, or arrange college visits. Most counselors have responsibility for helping many students and, as a result, it is difficult for them to provide individualized help to a particular student; one estimate was that the average ratio for all high schools of students to counselors was 460 to 1. Only about a quarter of public high schools have a counselor devoted to college counseling issues full-time, while almost three-quarters of private schools have a dedicated college counselor. Private school counselors tend to have substantially more contact with university admissions staff than public school counselors.

=== Consultants ===
Fee-based consultants, some available entirely online, can be hired to help a student gain admission, although there are some free programs to help underprivileged youth learn how to fill out applications, write essays, get ready for tests, and work on interviews. Generally, when hiring a college admissions consultant, parents and students try to understand the consultant's philosophy, learn what services are provided, and whether any help will be offered regarding advice about financial aid or scholarships. Consultants can help a student select schools to apply to, counsel them on test taking strategies, review scores, help with essay preparation (but not writing), review applications, conduct mock interviews, provide logistical planning, and collaborate with others such as athletic coaches. Consultants try to keep a low profile; however, one admissions dean explained that she can "sniff out when there has been some adult involved in the process", and admissions personnel may detect varying quality regarding writing samples when one part of an application is polished, while other parts are less polished. Assistance by consultants or other adults can go to extremes, particularly with hard-to-check variables such as the college essays; according to one view, plagiarism on admissions essays has been a "serious problem", particularly on applications to private universities and colleges. Another risk in hiring a consultant is over-packaging: the applicant appears so smooth and perfect that admissions officers suspect the person is not real but a marketing creation.

=== College admissions staff ===
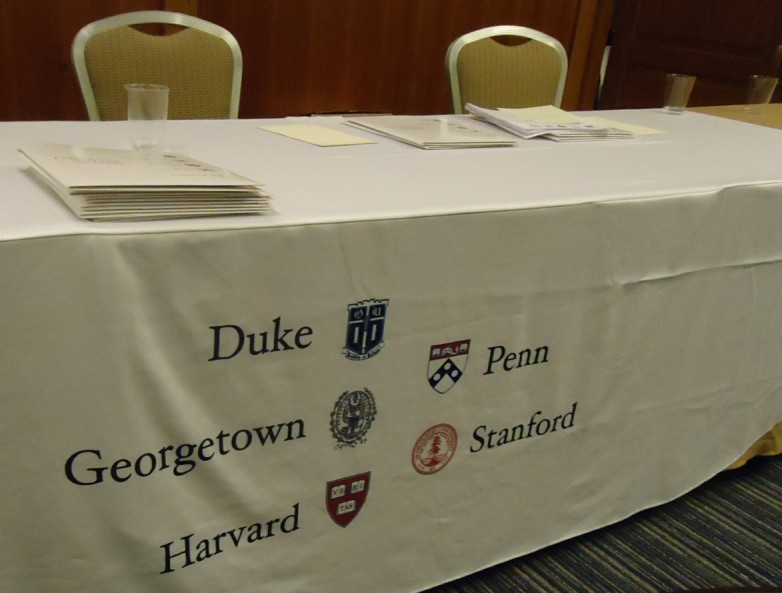
Elite and other universities send admissions officers to high schools and college fairs to encourage high school students to apply. While the chance of admission to highly selective colleges is typically under 10%, increased numbers of applications helps maintain and improve colleges' rankings.

A typical admission staff at a college includes a dean or vice president for admission or enrollment management, middle-level managers or assistant directors, admission officers, and administrative support staff. The chief enrollment management officer is sometimes the highest-paid position in the department, earning $121,000 on average in 2010, while admissions officers average only $35,000, according to one estimate. Admissions officers tend to be in the 30-to-40 age demographic. They are chosen for their experience in admissions, aptitude for statistics and data analysis, experience in administration and marketing and public relations. They serve dual roles as counselors and recruiters, and do not see themselves as marketers or salespeople, according to one view. They are evaluated on how well they "represent their college, manage their office, recruit staff members, and work with other administrators". Michele Hernandez suggested there were basically two types of officers: a first group of personable, sharp, people-oriented go-getter types who were often recent college grads; a second group was somewhat out-of-touch "lifers" who often did not graduate from a highly selective college. Officers are generally paid an annual salary, although there have been reports of some recruiters paid on the basis of how many students they bring to a college, such as recruiters working abroad to recruit foreign students to U.S. universities.

Many colleges and universities work hard to market themselves, trying to attract the best students and maintain a reputation for academic quality. Colleges spent an average of $585 to recruit each applicant in 2010. There are efforts to make increased use of social media sites such as Facebook to promote their colleges. Marketing brochures and other promotional mailings often arrive daily in the hope of persuading high school students to apply to a college. According to Joanne Levy-Prewitt, colleges send "view books" not because they intend to admit them, but "because they want multitudes of students to apply" to improve the college's selectivity and to make sure that they have as many well-qualified applicants as possible from whom to choose the strongest class. Colleges get access to names and addresses after students give permission to them after taking the PSAT or SAT exams.

=== Information sources ===
U.S. News & World Report compiles a directory of colleges and publishes rankings of them, although the rankings are controversial. Other sources rank colleges according to various measures, sell guidebooks, and use their rankings as an entry into consulting services. College Board launched a website called BigFuture in 2012 with tools to assist in the admissions process.

== Planning ==
International students may need to take tests showing English-language proficiency such as the TOEFL, IELTS, or PTE Academic. The twelfth grade is when applications are submitted.

== Selection of colleges ==
=== Rankings ===
The top 10 national universities (red) and liberal arts colleges (blue) in the 2022 U.S. News rankings show many located in the Northeast. The rankings have generated much controversy.

There are many college and university rankings, including those by U.S. News & World Report, Business Insider, Money, Washington Monthly, and Forbes.

Rankings have been the subject of much criticism. Since much of the data is provided by colleges themselves, schools can manipulate the rankings to enhance prestige, such as Claremont McKenna misreporting average SAT statistics, and Emory University misreporting student data for "more than a decade", as well as reports of false data from the United States Naval Academy and Baylor University. There is hypocrisy surrounding rankings: some colleges pretend to loathe the guidebooks that rank them, yet if they get a good write-up, they "wave it around like a bride's garter belt".

The choices made by colleges to boost their rankings have been criticized as destructive. Rankings may not take a college's affordability into account, factor in the average student indebtedness after college, or measure how well colleges educate their students. Rankings have been accused of tuning their algorithms to entrench the reputations of a handful of schools while failing to measure how much students learn. Some admission counselors maintain that rankings are poor predictors of a college's overall quality.

In 2007, members of the Annapolis Group discussed a letter to college presidents asking them not to participate in the U.S. News & World Report "reputation survey". A majority of the approximately 80 presidents at the meeting agreed not to participate, although the statements were not binding. Members pledged to develop alternative web-based information formats in conjunction with several collegiate associations. U.S. News & World Report responded that their peer assessment survey helps to measure a college's "intangibles" such as the ability of a college's reputation to help a graduate win a first job or entrance into graduate school.

Applications, admission and enrollment at 56 schools with admit rate averaging below 22% in Fall 2019–Fall 2022. Source: Common Data Sets / College announcements and publications
	Total (56 institutions)					27 private universities					6 public universities					23 liberal arts colleges				
						Ivy League, Stanford, MIT, UChicago, Duke, Northwestern, Vanderbilt, Johns Hopkins, Rice, USC, WashU, Tulane, Tufts, Georgetown, Carnegie Mellon, Notre Dame, Emory, NYU, BU, Northeastern					UCLA, UC Berkeley, Georgia Tech, UNC-Chapel Hill, UMich, UVA					Pomona, Claremont McK, Swarthmore, Bowdoin, Amherst, Williams, Colby, Barnard, Pitzer, Bates, Harvey Mudd, Colorado Coll, Middlebury, Wesleyan, Hamilton, Haverford, Carleton, Davidson, Wellesley, W&L, Colgate, Grinnell, Vassar				
Admit Year (Fall)	Apps	Admits	Enroll	Admit rate	Admit: enroll	Apps	Admits	Enroll	Admit rate	Admit: enroll	Apps	Admits	Enroll	Admit rate	Admit: enroll	Apps	Admits	Enroll	Admit rate	Admit: enroll
2001	645,111	198,815	79,872	30.8%	2.49	415,855	120,124	46,931	28.9%	2.56	138,627	49,041	22,110	35.4%	2.22	90,629	29,650	10,831	32.7%	2.74
2002	650,908	202,565	82,026	31.1%	2.47	418,230	123,779	48,626	29.6%	2.55	141,166	49,377	22,264	35.0%	2.22	91,512	29,409	11,136	32.1%	2.64
2003	681,989	206,423	82,544	30.3%	2.50	439,502	126,504	49,491	28.8%	2.56	146,165	50,209	22,262	34.4%	2.26	96,322	29,710	10,791	30.8%	2.75
2004	699,074	207,238	83,682	29.6%	2.48	453,319	126,441	49,615	27.9%	2.55	144,258	50,923	23,169	35.3%	2.20	101,497	29,874	10,898	29.4%	2.74
2005	737,493	213,865	83,591	29.0%	2.56	484,023	132,750	49,982	27.4%	2.66	147,507	51,430	22,639	34.9%	2.27	105,963	29,685	10,970	28.0%	2.71
2006	773,374	217,846	83,900	28.2%	2.60	516,292	135,568	49,507	26.3%	2.74	148,794	52,343	23,589	35.2%	2.22	108,288	29,935	10,804	27.6%	2.77
2007	822,156	220,200	85,740	26.8%	2.57	543,558	135,918	50,250	25.0%	2.70	163,374	54,788	24,637	33.5%	2.22	115,224	29,494	10,853	25.6%	2.72
2008	900,502	225,242	85,678	25.0%	2.63	600,623	140,741	50,180	23.4%	2.80	172,826	54,634	24,347	31.6%	2.24	127,053	29,867	11,151	23.5%	2.68
2009	945,442	237,141	87,201	25.1%	2.72	636,650	148,566	51,285	23.3%	2.90	186,771	58,364	24,830	31.2%	2.35	122,021	30,211	11,086	24.8%	2.73
2010	1,005,061	241,971	88,208	24.1%	2.74	686,095	151,404	51,658	22.1%	2.93	192,770	59,986	25,175	31.1%	2.38	126,196	30,581	11,375	24.2%	2.69
2011	1,081,719	242,188	88,691	22.4%	2.73	736,860	147,538	52,383	20.0%	2.82	210,869	64,962	25,092	30.8%	2.59	133,990	29,688	11,216	22.2%	2.65
2012	1,122,097	239,371	89,921	21.3%	2.66	763,233	143,454	52,109	18.8%	2.75	221,000	66,400	26,537	30.0%	2.50	137,864	29,517	11,275	21.4%	2.62
2013	1,197,549	237,696	89,586	19.8%	2.65	803,031	141,634	51,826	17.6%	2.73	253,272	67,242	26,461	26.5%	2.54	141,246	28,820	11,299	20.4%	2.55
2014	1,279,412	242,628	92,713	19.0%	2.62	837,455	142,789	53,096	17.1%	2.69	298,332	70,493	28,230	23.6%	2.50	143,625	29,346	11,387	20.4%	2.58
2015	1,325,730	240,687	92,548	18.2%	2.60	859,126	140,416	52,895	16.3%	2.65	312,640	70,418	28,160	22.5%	2.50	153,964	29,853	11,493	19.4%	2.60
2016	1,390,056	242,910	95,213	17.5%	2.55	899,097	139,467	53,542	15.5%	2.60	332,971	74,255	30,204	22.3%	2.46	157,988	29,188	11,467	18.5%	2.55
2017	1,451,021	238,317	96,667	16.4%	2.47	928,973	135,173	54,826	14.6%	2.47	355,081	73,976	30,301	20.8%	2.44	166,967	29,168	11,540	17.5%	2.53
2018	1,588,286	225,082	96,815	14.2%	2.32	1,019,631	123,734	54,771	12.1%	2.26	384,589	71,763	30,236	18.7%	2.37	184,066	29,585	11,808	16.1%	2.51
2019	1,635,975	213,999	95,601	13.1%	2.24	1,056,382	115,137	53,580	10.9%	2.15	383,853	70,249	30,380	18.3%	2.31	195,740	28,613	11,641	14.6%	2.46
2020	1,602,944	235,872	95,900	14.7%	2.46	1,026,587	128,793	54,022	12.5%	2.38	388,086	76,419	30,872	19.7%	2.48	188,271	30,660	11,006	16.3%	2.79
2021	1,992,872	226,931	105,549	11.4%	2.15	1,287,398	120,928	59,870	9.4%	2.02	479,225	76,115	32,857	15.9%	2.32	226,249	29,888	12,822	13.2%	2.33
2022	2,081,831	204,615	99,231	9.8%	2.06	1,320,818	106,389	54,905	8.1%	1.94	521,087	70,187	32,350	13.5%	2.17	239,926	28,039	11,976	11.7%	2.34
2023	2,095,264	201,134	99,856	9.6%	2.01	1,331,297	100,534	54,912	7.5%	1.83	526,238	72,227	33,113	13.7%	2.18	237,729	28,373	11,831	11.9%	2.40
2024	2,176,536	201,886	99,491	9.3%	2.03	1,372,213	100,959	55,022	7.4%	1.83	554,106	70,879	32,611	12.8%	2.17	250,217	30,048	11,858	12.0%	2.53

=== Costs ===
==== Sticker versus net price ====
Priciest colleges 2019–2020 tuition, room, board Source: Chronicle of Higher Education
School	Cost
Harvey Mudd	$77,589
U. Chicago	$77,556
Columbia	$76,920
Barnard	$75,524
Duke	$75,031
Scripps	$74,788
Trinity	$74,400
USC	$74,111
U. Penn	$73,960
Amherst	$73,950
Georgetown	$73,882

Most colleges and universities, particularly private ones, have an artificially high and unreliable sticker price while charging most students, by awarding grant and scholarship money, a "discounted price" that varies considerably. For example, in 2011–2012, the average sticker price for tuition, fees and living expenses at private colleges, was $38,590 while the average actual cost was $23,060; at public colleges, the average sticker price was $17,130 and the average actual cost was $11,380. The average full-time undergraduate gets $6,500 in grant aid along with $1,000 in tax-based aid to offset tuition and fees.

Sticker price is the full price colleges list in their brochures and on their websites. Net price is the price students actually pay. Net price accounts for the fact that many students receive grants or scholarships. So it can be considerably lower than sticker price.

— Jacob Goldstein, NPR, 2012

Discounting began in the 1970s and was dramatically expanded in the 1990s. Sticker prices are set at much higher than the real costs for most students, sometimes more than double, sometimes only one and a half times as high. Estimates are that 88% or 67% get some form of discount. The average first-year student may be paying 48% less than the sticker price. Generally, the sticker-to-net price discrepancy is greater at private colleges than public universities.

College Access IndexCommitment to economicdiversity of student body--top 20 schools (2017)--source: The New York Times
College	Index
UC-Irvine	1.90
UC-SantaBar	1.61
UC-Davis	1.60
UC-San Diego	1.58
UCLA	1.52
U.Florida	1.46
Amherst	1.44
Pomona	1.43
UC-Berkeley	1.38
Harvard	1.36
Vassar	1.36
Williams	1.35
Princeton	1.34
Wellesley	1.32
Stanford	1.31
Knox	1.30
UNC-Chapel	1.30
Columbia	1.26
Barnard	1.25
Yale	1.22

Colleges use high sticker prices to give themselves wide latitude in how to use funds to attract the best students, as well as entice students with special skills or increase its overall racial or ethnic diversity. The most sought-after students can be enticed by high discounts while marginal students can be charged full price. Further, the high sticker price is a marketing tool to suggest the overall worth of a college education by encouraging people to think that "schools that cost more must provide a better education". While there was growing concern about escalating college prices, most Americans believed that their personal investment in higher education was sound. But discounting adds complexity to decision-making, deterring some students from applying in some instances based on a false sense of unaffordability. Students from low-income backgrounds may be discouraged from applying or driven to attend less challenging colleges as a result of undermatching. Many schools now recruit students who pay full cost to subsidize those who can afford to pay much less, resulting in the financial makeup of the student body at some colleges skewed towards mostly affluent students and low-income students but few students from middle-class backgrounds. In 2015, however, there were several instances of private colleges reducing their tuition by more than 40%.

==== Net price calculators ====
In the fall of 2011, colleges were required by federal law to post a net price calculator on their websites to give prospective students and families a rough estimate of likely college costs for their particular institution, and to "demystify pricing". A student or family could go online, find the calculator at a college's website, and enter the required financial and academic information, and the calculator will provide a personalized estimate of the likely cost of attending that college. The first online calculators were started by Williams College. The online calculators look at financial need and academic merit to try to estimate the likely discounted price offered to a particular student from a particular college, using information including details from tax returns, household income, grade point averages and test scores. Schools vary in terms of their pricing formulas; some consider home equity as a factor while others disregard it.

There are numerous potential problems with the calculators. Some are difficult to find on a college's website; others require specific financial numbers, possibly leading to errors by parents or students; some are difficult to understand and use; some may be manipulated by schools to increase applications or to make it seem as if a college is "more affordable" than it is. Accuracy of calculator estimates may vary considerably from college to college. Ultimately aid decisions will not be made by calculators, but by humans in the admissions offices.

Another tool is the College Board's expected family contribution calculator that can give families an idea of how much college will cost, but not for any particular college.

Elite colleges with highest % of lower income studentsSource: The New York Times 2017
College	Students
UCLA	19%
Emory	16%
Barnard	15%
NYU	14%
Vassar	14%
Bryn Mawr	14%
MIT	14%
U. Miami	14%
Brandeis	13%
Wellesley	13%

==== Financial aid ====
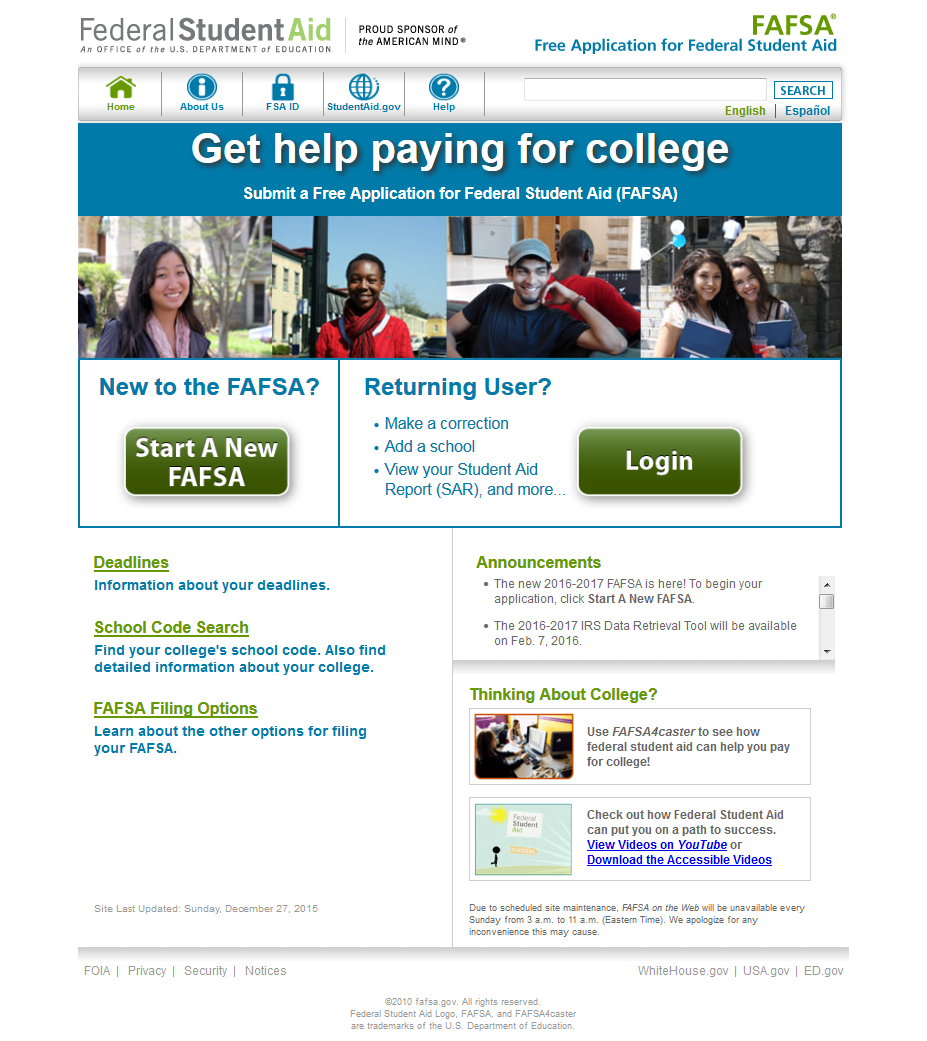
The FAFSA website at www.fafsa.ed.gov.

There are many reports that many applicants fail to apply for financial aid when they are qualified for it, with an estimated 1.8 million students in 2006 qualifying for aid but failing to apply. Applying for financial aid is recommended by almost all college admissions advisers, even for middle- and upper-class families applying to private colleges. Each college has its own criteria for determining financial need and loans. One advisor counseled against letting the sticker price of a college dissuade a student from applying, since many of the top colleges have strong endowments allowing them to subsidize expenses, such that the colleges are less expensive than so-called "second tier" or state colleges.

College advisers suggest that parents keep financial records, including tax forms, business records, to use when applying for financial aid, and complete the FAFSA online, using income and tax estimates (usually based on previous years), early in January of their college-bound student's twelfth grade. Admissions officers can see the names of up to nine other colleges a student has applied to. According to several reports, some colleges may deny admission or reduce aid based on their interpretation of the order of colleges on the FAFSA; accordingly, several sources recommend that colleges be listed alphabetically on the FAFSA to obscure any preferences. There are reports that many parents make mistakes when filling out the FAFSA information, and mistakes include failing to hit the "submit" button, visiting an incorrect FAFSA website, leaving some fields blank instead of properly entering a zero, spelling names or entering social security numbers or estimating tax data incorrectly. Since FAFSA formulas assume 20% of a student's assets can be used for college expenses as opposed to 6% of a parent's assets, advisors recommend moving funds from student to parent accounts before filing the FAFSA, including moving funds to a parent-controlled 529 plan tax-advantaged account. Filing taxes early is recommended, but using estimates for FAFSA from previous years is possible provided the numbers are updated later after taxes are filed. There are no fees for applying on the FAFSA site. According to one source, the best time to begin searching for scholarships is before the twelfth grade, to guarantee meeting deadlines. Several reports confirm that it is important to file aid forms such as the CSS Profile early in the school year.

In addition to cost factors, increasingly colleges are being compared on the basis of the average student debt of their graduates, and U.S. News & World Report has developed rankings based on average student indebtedness. A report in the Utne Reader chronicled substantial student indebtedness, and suggested that 37 million Americans in 2009 held student debt, and that nine in ten students used an average of 4.6 credit cards to pay for some educational expenses. The report chronicled an increase in average indebtedness from an average of $2,000 in 1980–81 to over $25,000 in 2009, as well as substantial decreases in Federal aid and Pell grants during that time period.

U.S. News & World Report and others suggest another factor overlooked in terms of financing college, which is the length of time it takes to earn a degree. Finishing a year early (in three years) lops off a substantial portion of the overall bill, while taking five years compounds the expense and delays entry into the workforce. Jacques Steinberg suggested that many college-bound students calculate how much debt they were likely to incur each year, and he suggested that debt for all four years of college should total less than the graduate's expected first year's salary after college, and preferably under $40,000. A handful of schools have "free tuition" policies for low income students, so that they graduate loan-free.

=== Colleges by type ===
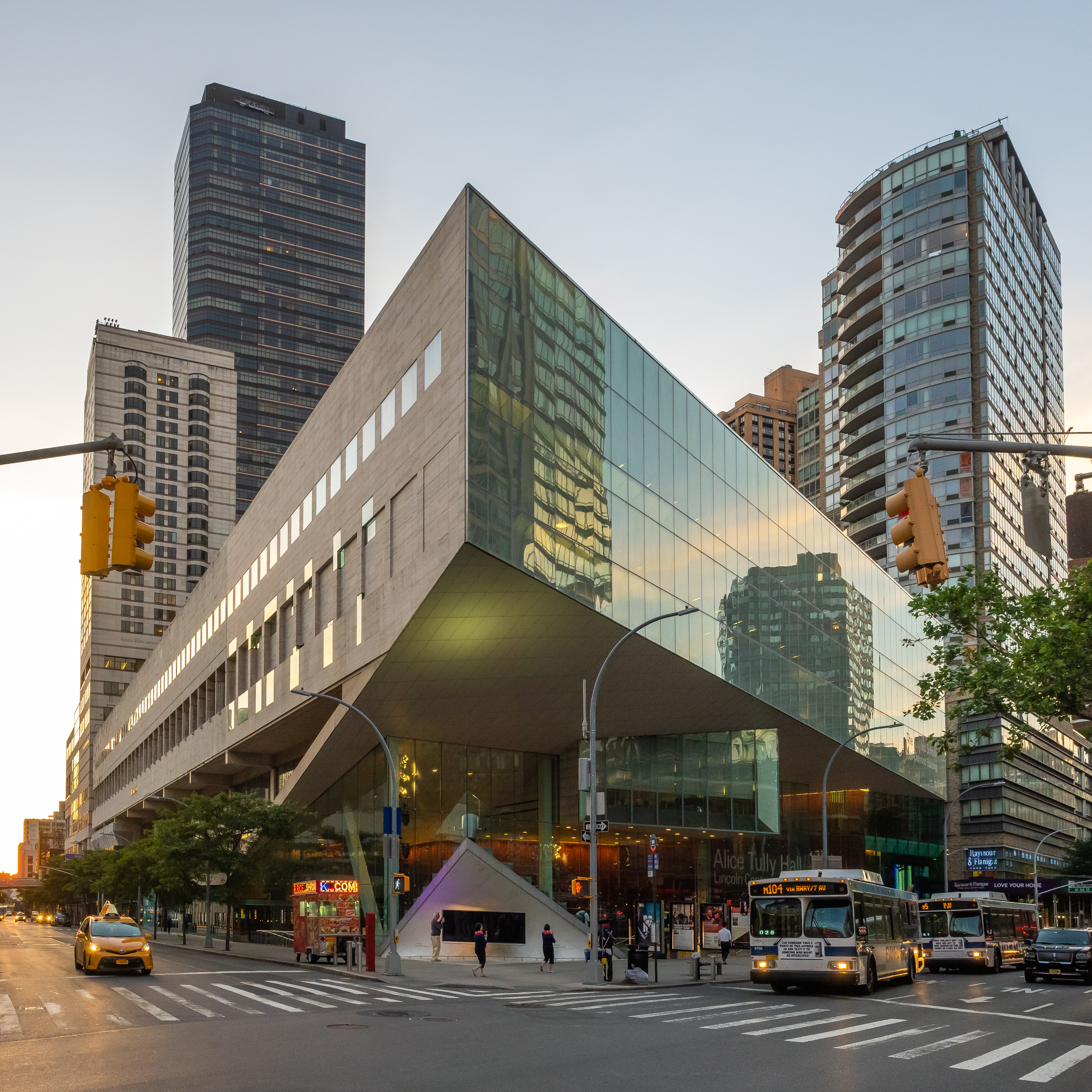
Some colleges focus on particular disciplines or subjects, such as the Juilliard School in New York City, which specializes in the performing arts

Most educational institutions in the U.S. are nonprofit. Colleges and universities in the U.S. vary in terms of goals: some may emphasize a vocational, business, engineering or technical curriculum while others may emphasize a liberal arts curriculum. Many combine some or all of the above. Another consideration is the male-female ratio; overall, 56% of enrolled college students are women, but the male-female ratio varies by college, year, and program.

Two-year colleges are often county- or community-oriented schools funded by state or local governments, and typically offer the associate degree (AA). They are generally inexpensive, particularly for in-state residents, and are focused on teaching, and accept most applicants meeting minimum grade and SAT score levels. Students commute to school and rarely live in dorms on campus. These schools often have articulation arrangements with four-year state public schools to permit students to transfer. Consultants suggest that community colleges are reasonably priced, and after two years with solid grades and academic performance, many colleges are willing to accept transfers.

Four-year colleges offer Bachelor of Arts (BA or AB) or Bachelor of Science (BS or SB) degrees. These are primarily undergraduate institutions, although some might have limited programs at the graduate level. Graduates of the tuition-free United States service academies receive both a Bachelor of Science degree and a commission.

Universities have both undergraduate and graduate students. Graduate programs grant a variety of master's degrees as well as the Doctor of Philosophy (PhD). Medical schools award either the MD or DO degrees while law schools award the JD degree. Both public and private universities are usually research-oriented institutions.

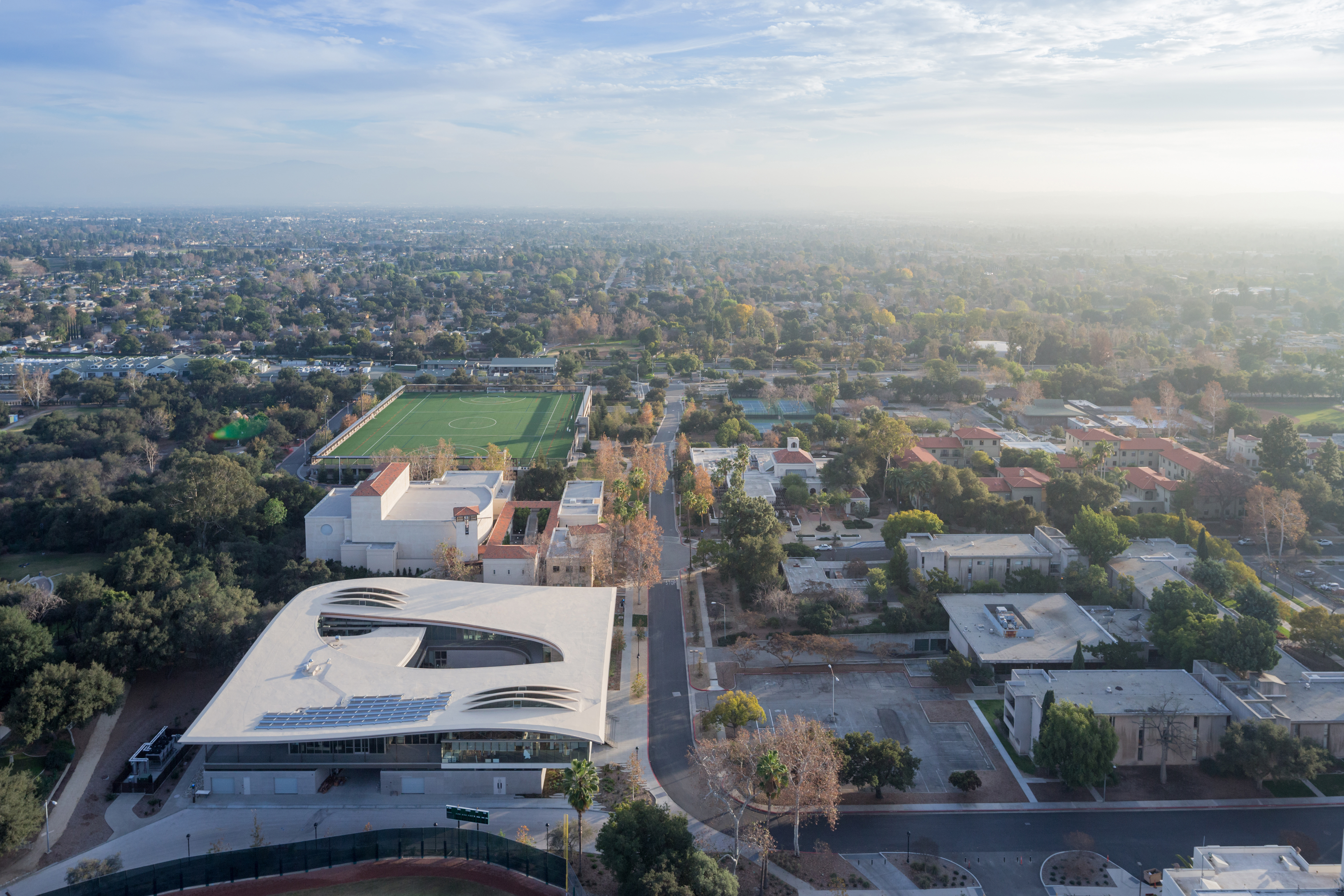
Liberal arts colleges like Pomona College emphasize liberal arts education at the undergraduate level

Liberal arts colleges are four-year institutions that emphasize interactive instruction, although research is still a component of these institutions. They are usually residential colleges with most students living on campus in dorms. They tend to have smaller enrollments, class sizes, and lower student-teacher ratios than universities, and encourage teacher-student interaction with classes taught by full-time faculty members rather than graduate students known as teaching assistants. There are further distinctions within the category of liberal arts colleges: some are coeducational, women's colleges, or men's colleges. There are historically black colleges; in addition, while most schools are secular, some stress a particular religious orientation. Most are private colleges but there are some public ones.

State colleges and universities are usually subsidized with state funds and tend to charge lower tuitions to residents of that state. They tend to be large, sometimes with student bodies numbering in the tens of thousands, and offer a variety of programs. They are generally less selective in terms of admissions than elite private schools and are usually less expensive, sometimes half or a third as much as a private institution for in-state residents. There are reports that due to recent budget shortfalls, many state schools are trying to attract higher-paying out-of-state residents. In the past few years, competition for spots in public institutions has become more intense, with some state schools such as the State University of New York reporting record numbers of students accepting their offers of admission. There are reports that tuition at state universities is rising faster than at private universities. Flagship state universities are usually the most prominent public schools in a state, often being the oldest and most well-funded.

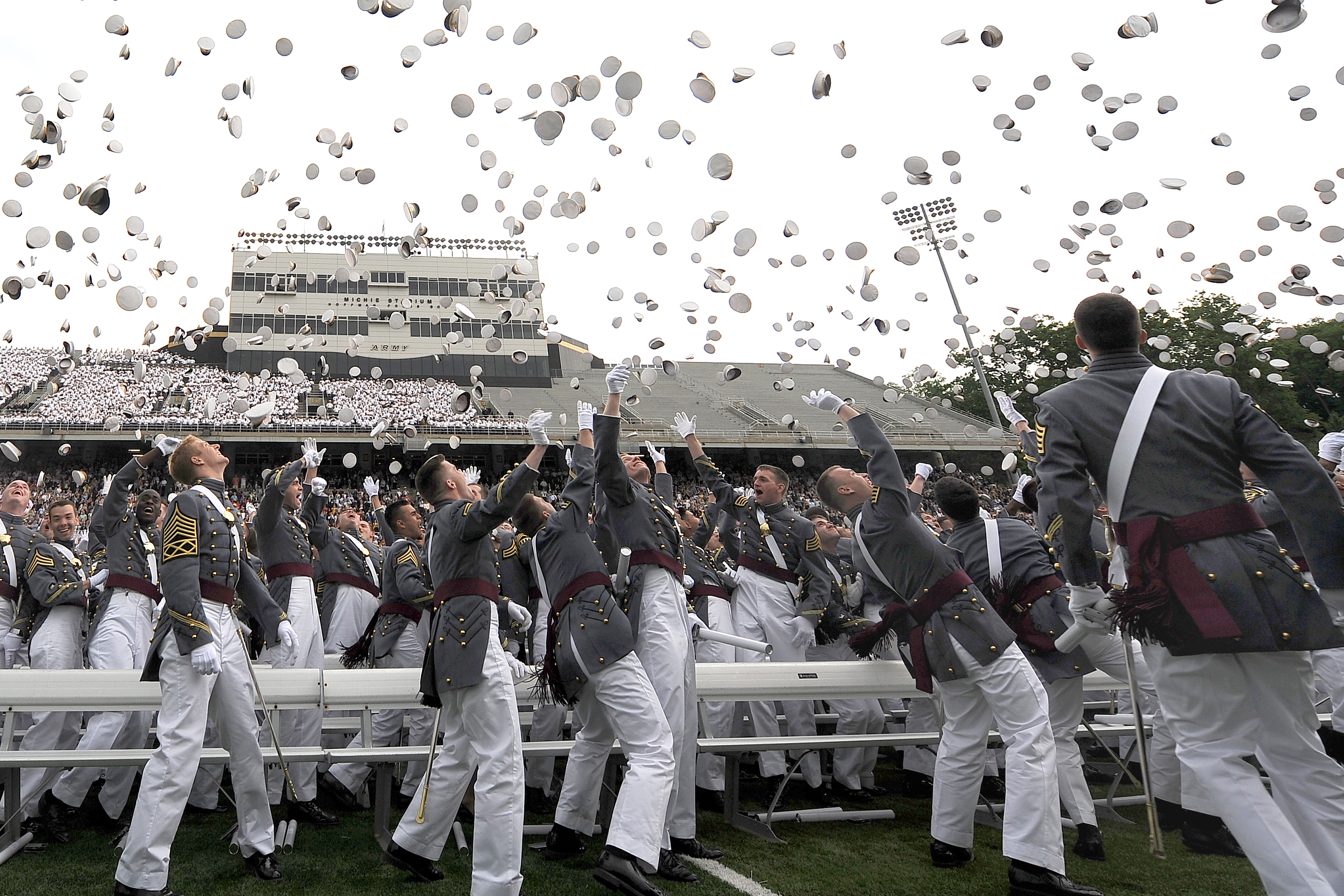
Specialty colleges such as the United States service academies have particular admissions requirements; applicants must be nominated by their congressperson.

=== Test preparation courses ===
There are conflicting reports about the usefulness of test preparation courses. Mamlet and VanDeVelde suggest that "most students don't need a coach or a class" and that the single largest factor was "familiarity with the test". Another report agreed that SAT/ACT prep courses were a waste of money and that taking a few practice exams, and understanding how each test works, was all that was needed.

==== Standardized admissions tests ====
In 2003, according to one estimate, 1.4 million students took the SAT and 1.4 million also took the ACT test, paying about $50 per test. Generally counselors suggest that students should plan on taking the SAT or ACT test twice, so that a low score can possibly be improved. One advisor suggested that students with weak SAT or ACT scores could consider applying to colleges where these measures were optional. One suggested retaking the tests if there are "subpar test scores" in September and October (if applying early admission) or November and December (if applying regular admission.) Generally over half of eleventh graders retaking the SAT or ACT tests during the twelfth grade saw improvements in their scores. Colleges vary in terms of how much emphasis they place on these scores.

A consensus view is that most colleges accept either the SAT or ACT, and have formulas for converting scores into admissions criteria, and can convert SAT scores into ACT scores and vice versa relatively easily. The ACT is reportedly more popular in the midwest and south while the SAT is more popular on the east and west coasts.

ACT test	SAT test
Content-based test	Tests reasoning ability
Emphasizes higher math	Emphasizes vocabulary
Longer questions	Trickier questions
More popular in south & midwest	More popular in east & west
Science reasoning section	Vocabulary section
No penalty for wrong answers	No penalty for wrong answers
Greater choice in selecting which scores to send to colleges	Fewer options
Difficult questions randomly interspersed	Difficulty progresses within each section

Regarding whether to choose the SAT or ACT, the consensus view is that both tests are roughly equivalent and tend to bring similar results, and that each test is equally accepted by colleges. Reporter Jacques Steinberg in The New York Times suggested that admissions deans repeatedly inform him that colleges view the ACT and SAT tests equally and do not have a preference. At the same time, small differences between the tests may translate into a slight benefit for the test-taker. One report suggested that the SAT favors "white male students" from upper income backgrounds. Another report suggests that the ACT has more questions geared to higher levels of high school mathematics, suggesting that students who do well in math may perform better, but that the SAT is a better choice for students with an excellent vocabulary. According to one view, the SAT is more focused on testing reasoning ability while the ACT is more of a content-based test of achievement. In addition, according to this view, some SAT questions can be trickier and harder to decipher while some ACT questions may be longer; question difficulty progresses within each SAT section while difficult questions are randomly interspersed in the ACT; the SAT has a separate vocabulary section while the ACT has a separate science reasoning section. In 2016 the SAT was updated to remove the penalty for random guessing; the College Board advises that test-takers will benefit by guessing.

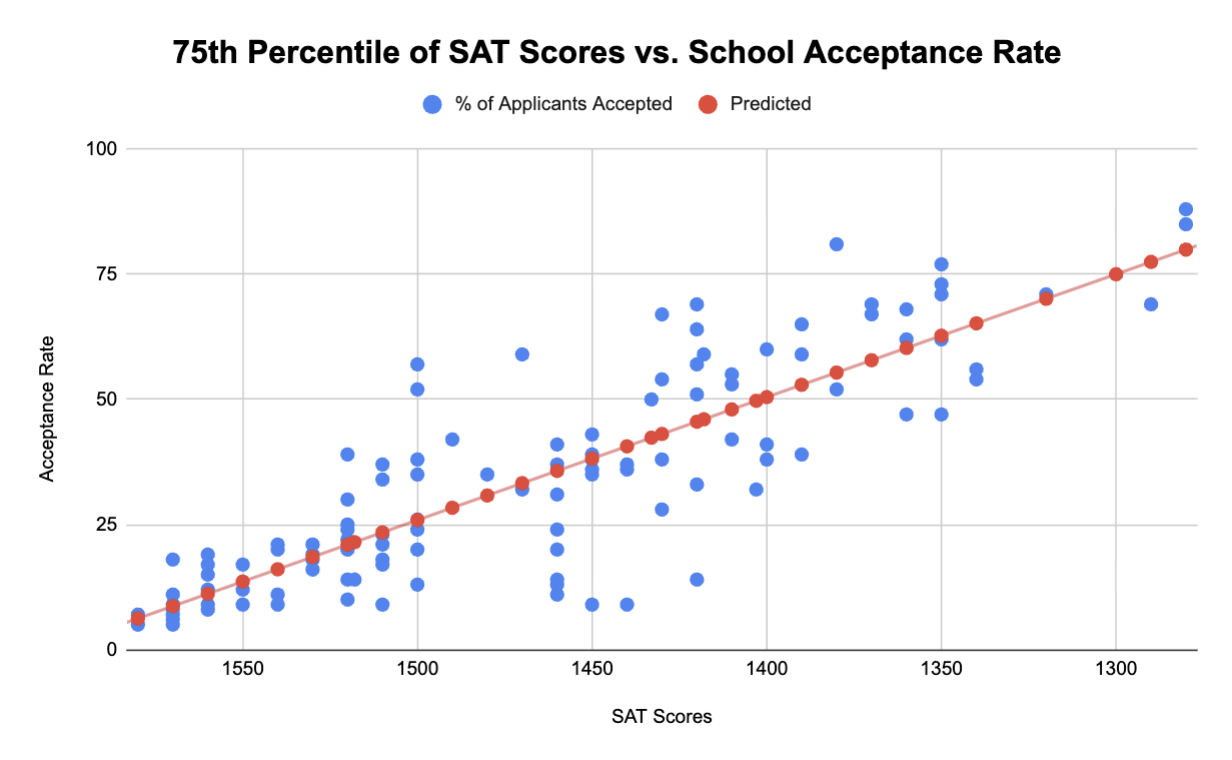
Each institution is represented as a data point, showing how selectivity tends to increase as SAT benchmarks rise.

==== SAT Subject Tests ====
Many colleges require, recommend, or consider SAT Subject Tests in the admissions process. One described them as "true equalizers" in admissions, suggesting how strong a high school is, and elaborated that some admissions officers consider them to be a better indicator of academic ability than high school grades. Another suggested that selective colleges emphasize SAT Subject Tests, while public colleges place less emphasis on them. The SAT Subject Tests were discontinued by the College Board at the beginning of 2021.

==== Advanced Placement tests ====
There was a report that scores on Advanced Placement exams could be helpful in the evaluations process. One report suggested there was a limit on the number of AP tests that should be taken, such that taking 12 AP tests was not as helpful as taking five and doing well on those five.

=== Interviews ===
There are differing recommendations about the importance of interviews, with the consensus view that interviews were overall less important than college admissions essays, but should be done if they were offered. One advisor suggested that visits by college admissions personnel to the high schools were a waste of time for colleges, since there was not enough time to get to know specific applicants. In addition, she felt that personal interviews were generally overrated, though she noted that many Ivies have alumni interviews, which can help in borderline situations. One counselor suggested that if an interview was offered by a college admissions program, then it was not really optional but it should be seen as a requirement, that is, not going to such an interview could be detrimental to a student's chances for admission. Another suggested that a student should try to get an interview, even if it was not required, since it might help "exhibit character strengths" that might not show up via grades on high school transcripts. Several reports noted that most Ivy League schools have abandoned the interview requirement, but that if there is an opportunity for an interview, even with an alumnus of the college, then it is a good idea to do it since not doing it signals a lack of interest in the school. Knowing a college can be helpful during an interview, so that an applicant can say something specific about the school, or a professor who teaches there, or a subject or internship opportunities, since it shows sincere interest. Interviews (if offered) may be more of a factor at small liberal arts colleges:

Our advice is that if offered an interview, a student should take it ... And they should dress as if they are going to dinner with their grandparents. The biggest faux pax comes in inappropriate dress for both sexes. Spaghetti straps, buttons that pop open. For boys a rumpled T-shirt ... If you look in the mirror and you think you look good, change your clothes. This is not a date.

— Mamlet and VanDeVelde

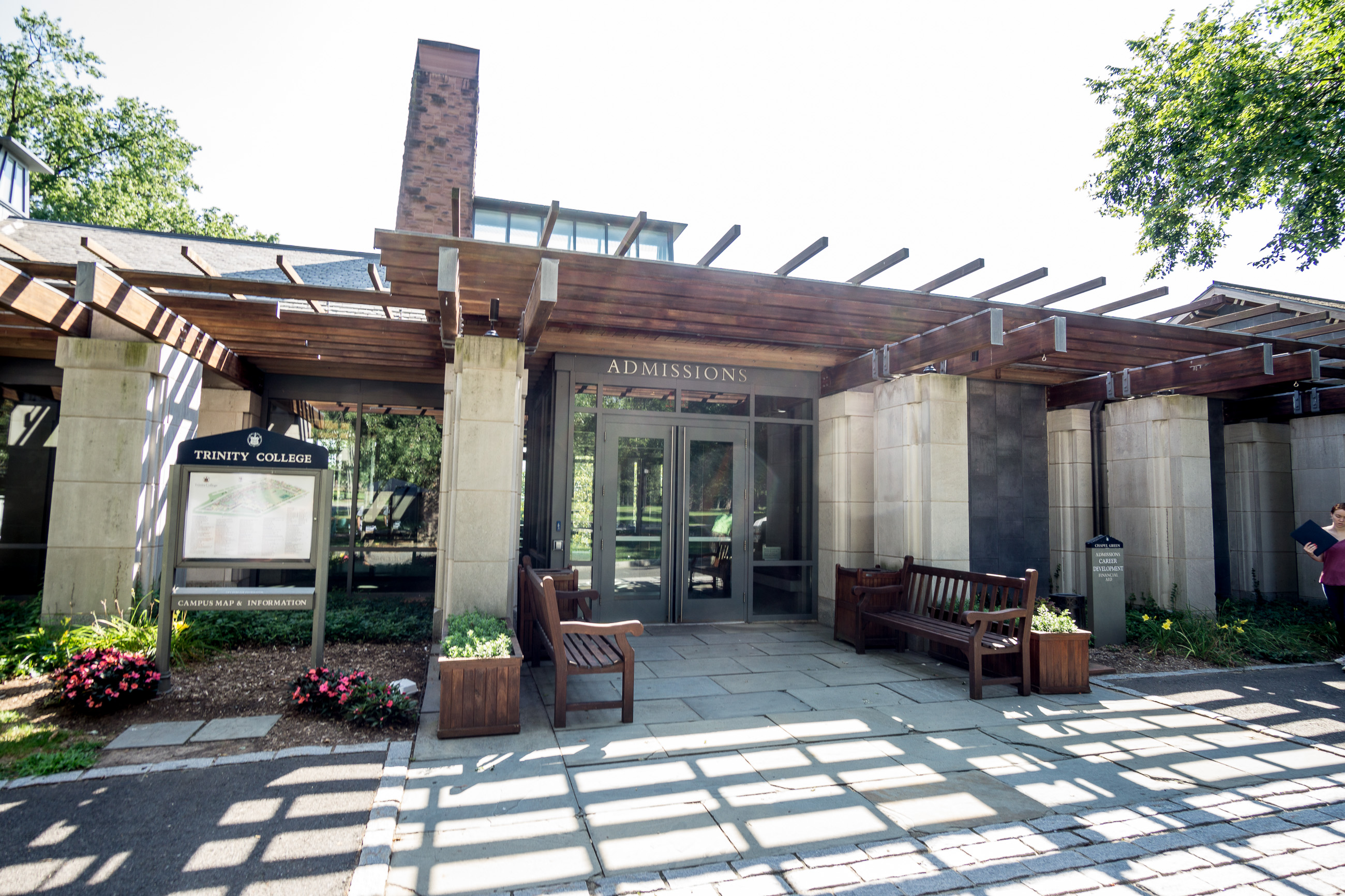
The admissions office of Trinity College in Hartford, Connecticut

One suggested that a goal of interview preparation should be to present oneself as "comfortable with spontaneous conversation" and be able to talk about interests without sounding like the answers were prepared in advance, and suggested it was important to show intellectual passion and a love of learning with a deep excitement, and show "social maturity" with sensitivity, empathy for others unlike oneself, and concern for issues larger than personal career ambitions. Applicants should have an attitude that was not be what can the college offer but what can the student offer the college, avoid asking questions about facts better answered elsewhere, and show an openness to new ideas, an ability to work cooperatively with others, ambition, and caring about others. Interviewees should be ready for sometimes provocative questions to test social sensitivity; if an interviewer asks a "baiting or leading question", an applicant should respond by laughing while politely disagreeing with the perspective, and to keep trying to enjoy the conversation with the interviewer. Another advisor suggested that students must be prepared to answer the question What is your biggest failure in an interview. Applicants should avoid sounding snide, annoyed, contemptuous, and avoid describing oneself as humiliated, bored, depressed, angry, shy, inhibited, anxious, frightened, and frustrated, and should be upbeat but avoid going for the hard sell. Another report suggested that shy or timid applicants were at a disadvantage. Another advisor suggested that a student try to find a common bond with the interviewer, and send a brief follow-up letter afterwards.

Due to the Coronavirus pandemic, colleges began offering interviews over video conferencing platforms such as Zoom.

=== Essays ===
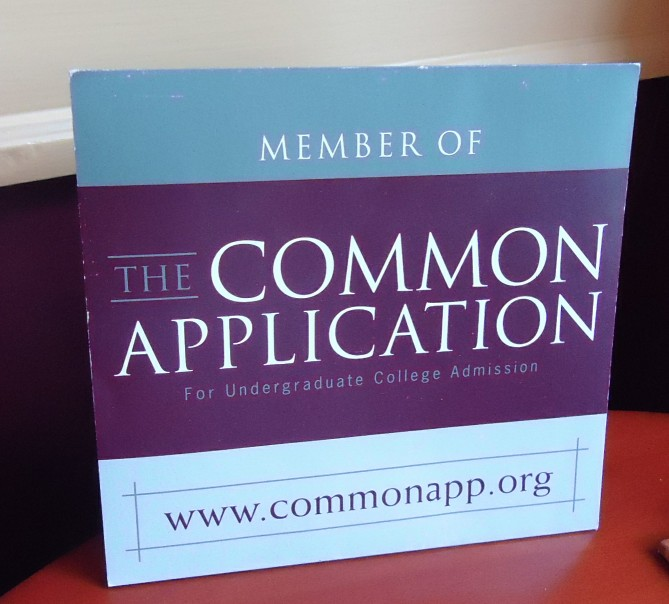
The Common Application.

There are differing opinions about the importance of the college essay. The consensus view is that the essay is less important than grades and test scores, but that an essay can make a difference in some instances, often at highly selective colleges where they can "make or break your application". There was one report that essays were becoming more important as a way to judge a student's potential and that essays have supplanted personal interviews as a primary way to evaluate a student's character.

The Common Application requires that personal statements be 250 to 650 words in length. Although applicants may strive to reach the word limit, college admissions officers emphasize that the most important part is honing and rewriting:

Writing is easy; rewriting is hard. And essays deserve to be rewritten several times. Lots of kids think the objective is to write about something that will impress the admission office. In part that is true, but what impresses an admission officer is an essay that conveys something positive about the applicant; that allows the committee to get to know the kid just a bit from those few pieces of paper. The essay is an opportunity to provide a different perspective about the applicant, a reason to accept a kid. It is an opportunity not to be wasted.

Advisors suggest that the essay should be concise, honest (with no embellishments), coherent, not boring, accurate, and visually evocative. The essay should reveal a likeable and intelligent individual. It should approach humor and controversial topics with caution and balance. Other tips include avoiding jargon or abbreviations, overly emotional appeals, profanity or texttalk (example: Schools H8 2 C texttalk), or artiness (e.g. poetry in an application) or cockiness.

Former guidance counselor for students at Andover and college admissions authority Donald Dunbar suggested that essays must emphasize personal character and demonstrate intellectual curiosity, maturity, social conscience, concern for the community, tolerance, and inclusiveness. He advises to not merely "be yourself", but show your "best self". Dunbar furthermore claims that demonstrating class participation suggests a "willingness to go beyond selfishness" and shows enthusiasm for learning. Alan Gelb suggests that the only "no-no" is "shameless self-promotion". Topics to avoid include babysitting experiences, pets, encounters with illegal drugs or alcohol or criminal activity, excuses to explain a low grade, stories about a former home or big brother or sister, a simple listing of achievements, expressing thanks for being chosen as a leader, talking about a "wilderness leadership course", general complaining or whining, racism or sexism or disrespect for groups of people, bad taste or profanity or vulgarity or bathroom humor, early love or sex experiences, criticism or disrespect for parents, telling only jokes, excessive bragging or too many instances of the "I" pronoun, personal health information about yourself or a friend or a family member, and copy-and-pasting a term paper in the essay form such as about global warming or the European debt crisis. Applicants should refrain from express opinions too strongly as if no counterviews were possible. The topic should be something the applicant cares about, and should show leadership in the sense of "asserting yourself to help others have more success". According to Dunbar, leadership is not necessarily about being in charge such as being the team captain or school president. Applicants should present a broad perspective and avoid simplistic words such as never, always, only, or nobody, which suggest narrow thinking. Dunbar advised against the standard "tell 'em what you've told 'em" essay formula but doing something different, interesting, and exciting.

Former admissions director Michele Hernandez agreed, and suggested that the best essay topics were a slice-of-life story with poignant details, in which the writer shows and does not tell. She suggested that a student show their essay to a literate friend and ask if would they admit this person to the college. She recommended that applicants not try to come across as a "preppy well-off kid" but downplay parental status. Advisors Mamlet and VanDeVelde suggest that students proactively try to explain an unusual grade, such as a low grade in a core course. There are online databases available to help students write cogent essays.

=== Teacher recommendations ===
Many colleges ask for teacher recommendations, typically from eleventh or twelfth grade teachers of core courses who know the student well. A counselor recommendation is often requested as well. One report suggested that having more than four recommendations was a mistake, as a "thick file" indicated a "thick student" to admissions personnel. Teacher recommendations are becoming less important as a rating measure, according to one report. In addition, a few colleges are asking for recommendation letters from parents to describe their child:

You might think they do nothing but brag ... But parents really nail their kids. They really get to the essence of what their daughter is about in a way we can't get anywhere else.

— Deb Shaver, director of admissions at Smith College

=== Other considerations ===
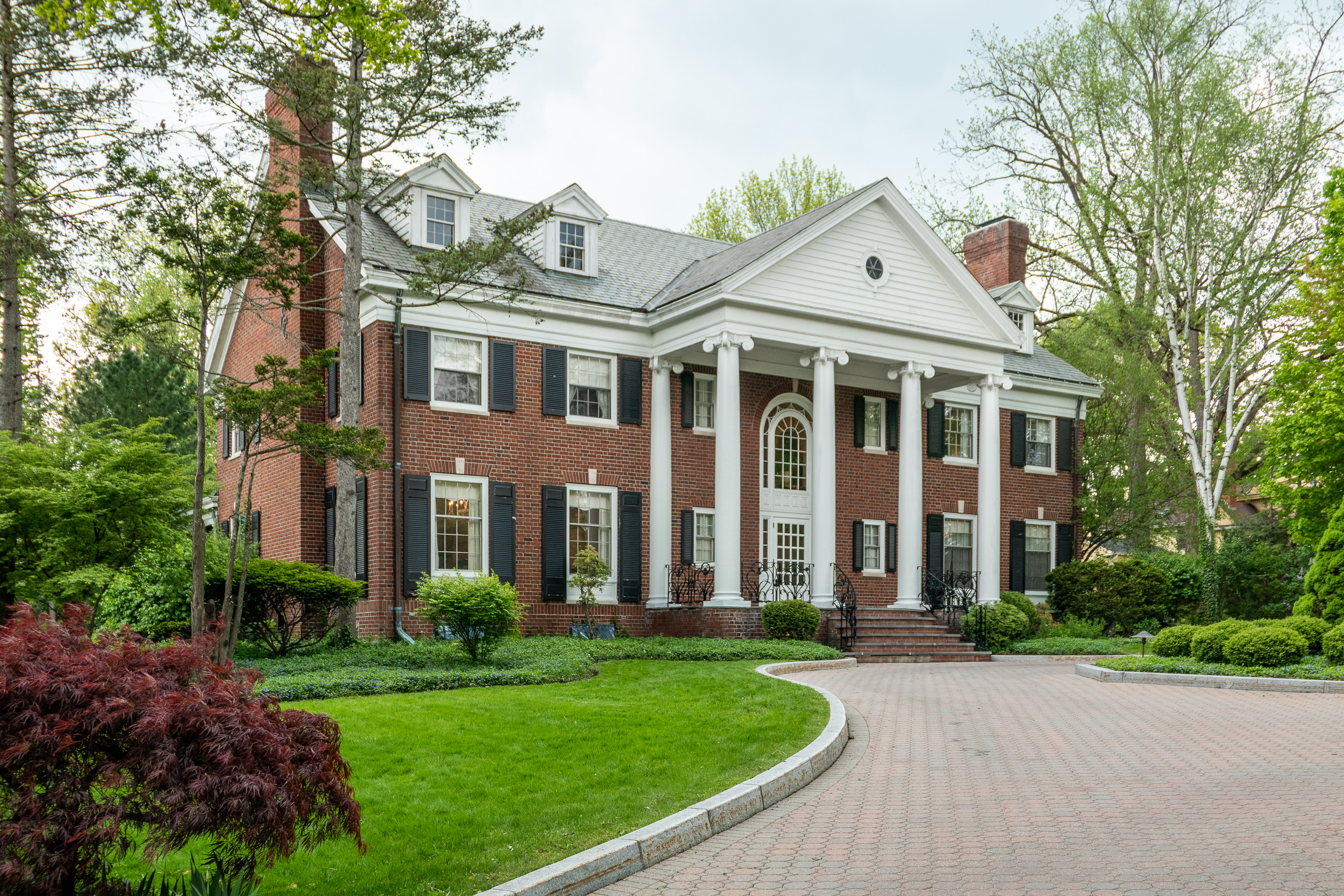
The Office of Admissions at Elmira College

Advisors counsel that applicants should meet deadlines, spend time researching colleges, be open-minded, have fun, communicate what "resonates" to the applicant about a particular school, not fall in love with one or two colleges, follow directions precisely and make sure to click the "submit" button. Rudeness towards staff members, feigning enthusiasm, and being pretentious are other turnoffs reported by admissions officers. There is strong consensus among counselors and advisors that starting the college search early is vital. One recommends starting early in the twelfth grade; another suggests that even this is too late, and that the process should begin during the eleventh grade and summer before twelfth grade. Sources suggest that students who begin the process earlier tend to earn more acceptance letters. Another advantage of beginning early is so that applications can be proofread for mistakes. Advisors suggest that emails should be sent to specific persons in the admissions office, not to a generalized inbox. Advisors suggest that applicants sending in paper applications should take care that handwriting is legible, particularly email addresses. Advisors counsel that mistakes or changes should be explained somewhere in the application; for example, an adviser at Grinnell College suggested that a record need not be perfect but there must be an "explanation for any significant blip". Advisors suggest that applicants should "own up to any bad behavior" such as suspensions since schools are "dutybound to report them", and suggest that a person should "accept responsibility and show contrition for "lessons learned", according to one view. Disciplinary actions are usually reported to the colleges by the high school as a matter of course. Advisors suggest that the application should help a student position themselves to create a unique picture. It helps, according to one advisor, if a person knows himself or herself, because that enables an applicant to communicate effectively with a prospective school. A report in The New York Times in 2016 suggested that some universities were considering changing their admissions guidelines to be more inclusive of less affluent applicants, to put less emphasis on standardized test and AP scores, and to put more emphasis on determining "which students' community-service projects are heartfelt and which are merely window dressing"; the report suggested that college admissions policies were often "cited as a culprit in sleep deprivation, anxiety and depression among students".

=== International applications ===
Many schools ask that non-native English speakers provide TOEFL or IELTS scores

International students form a large and growing percentage of applicants to American universities. According to Andover counseling director Sean Logan, applications to American universities from foreign students have increased dramatically in the past decade. International applications are typically similar to domestic ones but with additional complications. Most international applicants do not receive a GPA score or transcript from their school. Most will not normally take SAT or ACT exams, so these must be arranged. Most American universities are happy to accept international qualifications such as the International Baccalaureate and A Levels, although it is often up to the applicant to elaborate on the meaning of these qualifications. Non-native English speakers may be asked to provide English language qualifications such as TOEFL or IELTS scores. If a university requires or offers an interview, these can normally be conducted over the phone or with alumni residing in the applicant's country. International applicants often must cope with higher tuition fees and less available financial aid, although this varies significantly by college. Further, international applicants must also apply for a student visa, which can be a complex and time-consuming process.

College admissions officers are generally looking to build a well-rounded class and look for students who will complement each other. Consequently, many schools are looking for students who are passionate and excel at particular things, and candidates who fulfill certain institutional needs rather than a "well-rounded kid".

Colleges are looking for ... the well-rounded class. Colleges put together their entering class as a mosaic: a few great scholars for each academic department; a handful of athletes; some musicians, dancers, and theater stars; a few for racial and economic diversity; some potential club leaders, etc. Colleges want a kid who is devoted to – and excels at – something. The word they most often use is passion.

— Steve Cohen in The Washington Post, 2011

Colleges want students who have demonstrated through their actions an ability to see and connect with a world that is larger than they are.

— Robin Mamlet and Christine Vandevelde, 2011

Institutional needs include athletics and music as well as geographical, cultural, racial, and socioeconomic diversity (Pell Grant recipients, first-generation students).

Some schools, particularly public universities, will use admissions criteria which are almost entirely formulaic in certain aspects of admission. For example, they may be required by statute to admit a minimum number of in-state students, or to guarantee admission to students graduating the top 6% of their high school class, or to guarantee admission to valedictorians. Many admits, however, are made on the basis of subjective judgments regarding the student's "fit" for the institution.

Admissions offices must read through thousands of applications, each of which include transcripts, letters of recommendation, and the application itself. In 2009, the average admissions officer was responsible for analyzing 514 applications, and officers have experienced an upward trend in the number of applications they must read over time. A typical college application receives only about 25 minutes of reading time, including three to five minutes for the personal essay if it is read.

Larger admissions offices will have specialists assigned to cover different regions, and individual officers may act liaison for a regional set of high schools developing a deep understanding of their curriculum and rigor. The reading and preliminary admit / deny decision may be divided up into committees of readers, and borderline candidates are then discussed more collectively. Some admissions offices use a scoring system in an effort to normalize the many applicants. Criteria include standardized test scores (generally ACT and/or SAT), college prep courses, grades (as shown in the high school transcript), strength of curriculum, class rank, degree of extracurricular involvement, and leadership potential. A combination of these can be used to derive an academic index. For example, at Dartmouth College, data goes into a master card for each application, which leads to a ready sheet, where readers summarize applications; then, an initial screening is done: top applications go directly to the director of admissions for approval while lackluster ones go to another director. Dartmouth uses "A" for accept, "R" for reject, "P" for possible, with "P+" and "P-" being variants. A committee might spend a week with the "P" ones, of which they only accept about a sixth.

Many colleges also rely on personal essay(s) written by the applicant and letters of recommendation written by the applicant's teachers and guidance counselor. One principal benefit of the essay lies in its ability to further differentiate students who have perfect or near-perfect grades and test scores. Institutions place different weight on these criteria: for example, "test optional" schools do not require or even accept the SATs for admission. Some factors are beyond a student's control, such as a college's need in a given year for diversity, legacy applicants, or athletic recruiting.

Some colleges hire statistical experts known as "enrollment consultants" to help them predict enrollment by developing computer models to select applicants in such a way as to maximize yield and acceptance rates. Some of these models take into account factors such as an applicant's "zip code, religion, first-choice major and extracurricular interests, as well as academic performance". Some colleges extract information from the federal FAFSA financial aid form, including names of other schools the applicant is applying to.

=== Academic evaluation ===
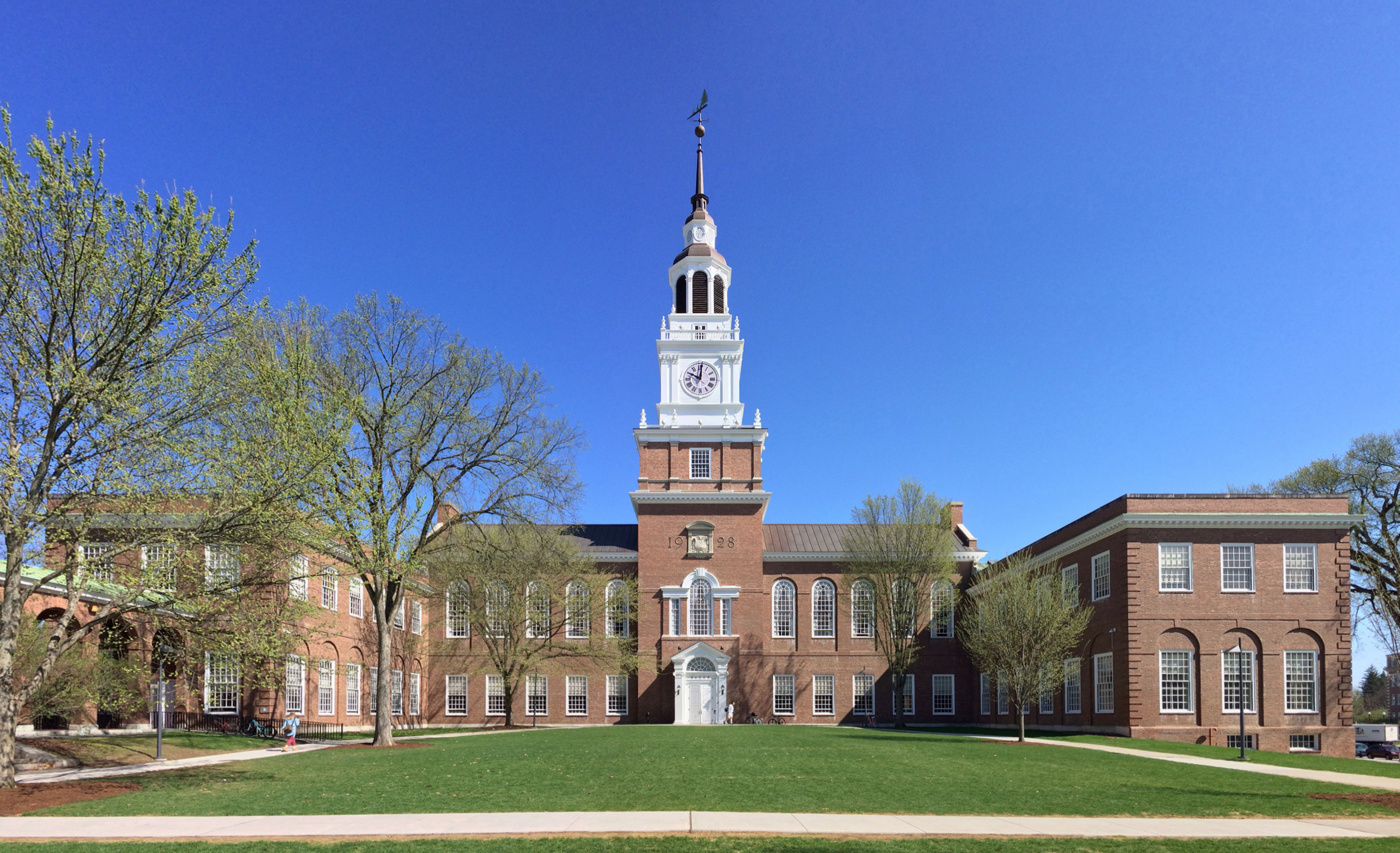
Dartmouth College admissions, according to Michele Hernandez, spends a week examining the possibles or "P"s, and after much deliberation, accepts perhaps a sixth of them.

==== High school grades, rigor of curriculum, and college prep courses ====
High school academic performance is generally the single most important factor in winning admission. Maintaining high grades is particularly important for the fall semester of twelfth grade. Academic performance in core courses is especially important. An ideal academic record is one of increasingly better grades in courses of progressive difficulty. Ninth grade grades generally do not count much, but trends are important—an upward trend in grades was a positive factor, a decline a negative one. Public universities are more likely to evaluate applicants based on grades and test scores alone, while private universities tend to be more "holistic" and consider other measures.

Colleges also evaluate applicants by examining how a student has successfully exploited what a high school has had to offer. The strongest candidates will have been challenged by the most demanding courses their school has to offer. Where AP courses are offered, having a high grade point average based on good grades in AP-level or honors courses will be looked upon favorably, but dropping a hard course will be seen negatively.

The college admissions office usually will know schools well enough to understand that not all schools offer AP-level courses so candidates from those schools are not put at a disadvantage. On the other hand, the admissions office will have a high school profile and takes into account such data as curriculum offerings, demographics, and grade distributions at the high school.

==== ACT and SAT scores ====
These are read in conjunction with the high school academic record, but their importance varies from school to school. Some schools are test-optional where applicants do not need to submit scores. Schools typically release information on the range of scores from their candidate pool as well as accepted student pool to make applicants aware of their student profile. Some schools will consider superscore results or superscoring when an applicant has taken the SAT multiple times by combining the highest score from different test subsections, although superscoring is rarely done for the ACT because of difficulty processing five separate rounded numbers.

==== Demonstrated interest ====
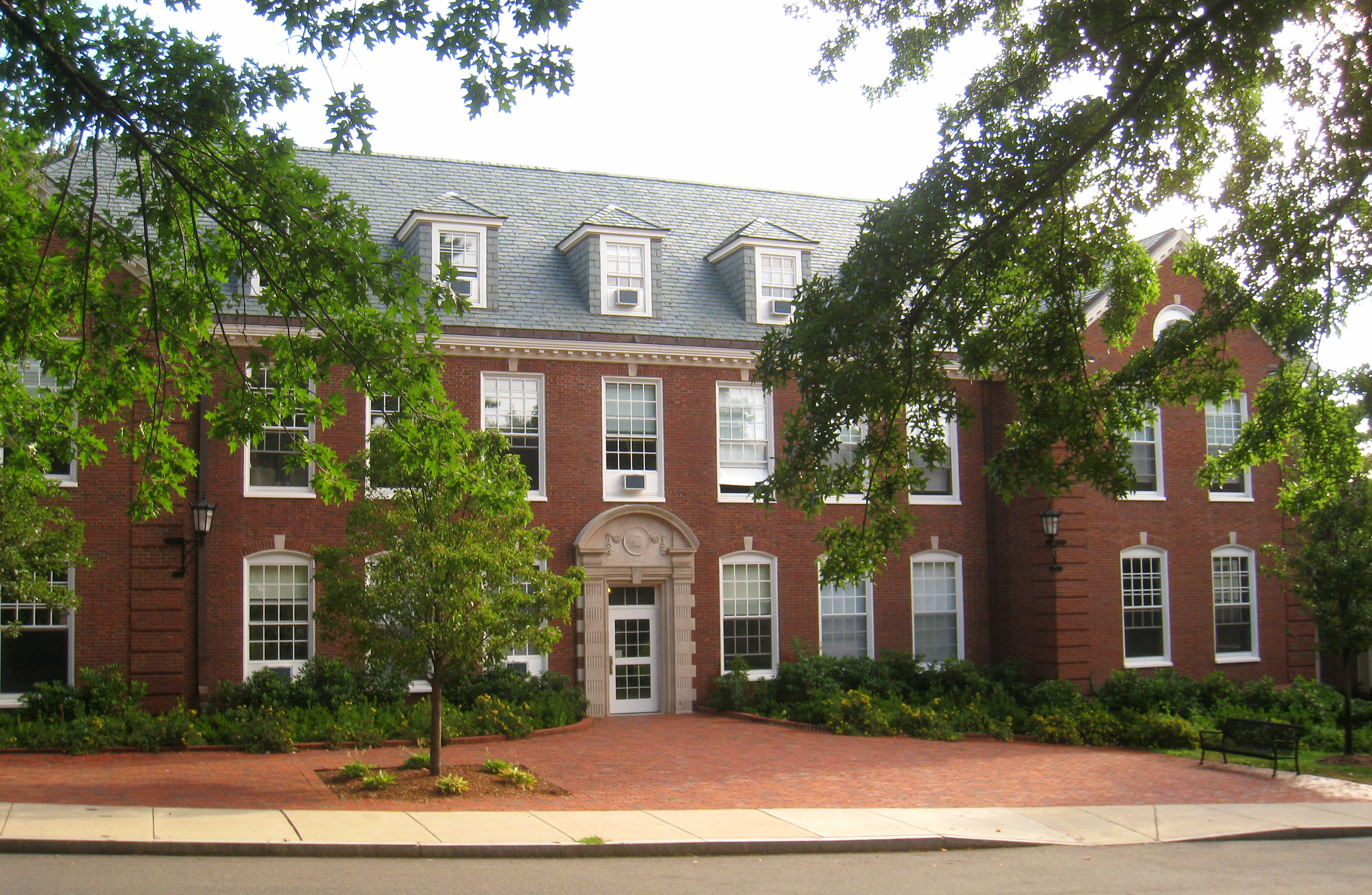
Yield protection is sometimes referred to as Tufts syndrome

This can be an important factor in some situations, sometimes a "driving factor", since a college may be more likely to say yes to a student likely to matriculate. Accordingly, it has been advised to become knowledgeable about schools being applied to, and "tailor each application accordingly". College visits (including overnight ones), interviews, attending College Fair days, comments in the essay, contacting college faculty members, answering and opening emails, place position of the college on the FAFSA form or its FAFSA position, and other indications of interest can be a factor for many colleges concerned about their yield—the percent of students who accept an offer of enrollment. According to Andover's college counseling director Sean Logan, it is important to have numerous contact points with colleges to show demonstrated interest: visiting, phone contact, emailing, visits to websites (including number of clicks as well as length of time on the website), whether a college visit included a tour and interview, and whether a college-recommended off-campus personal interview was done. Schools such as Connecticut College and Emory University have been credited as "popularizing the yield game" by refusing well-qualified students who failed to show much real interest in attending, as a way to boost their yield scores. One top high school student was waitlisted at a "likely" college for showing lack of interest:

We assumed they weren't coming, because we didn't have much contact from them. We know they're probably using us as a back-up and they haven't done much to show any sincere interest, so we decided to waitlist them.

— Andover college counseling director Sean Logan, remembering a comment from a college admissions director.

==== Active participation ====
One report suggested that colleges seek students who will be actively involved on campus and not spend every day studying alone. As a result, they look for recommendations from teachers that suggest active participation.

==== Weeding out difficult people ====
Admissions officers often try to screen out difficult people. According to Dunbar, many colleges are "afraid of aggression". He recommends avoiding "harsh humor" and signs of severe emotion, anger, or aggression. Admissions evaluators look for signals that might indicate a difficult person, such as disrespectful criticisms of others and evidence of substance abuse.

==== Analysis of essays ====
Michele Hernandez suggested that almost all admissions essays were weak, cliche-ridden, and "not worth reading". The staff gets thousands of essays and has to wade through most of them. When she worked as an admissions director at Dartmouth, she noticed that most essays were only read for three minutes. Some too-common essay types were the "outward bound" essay about how a person discovered their inner grit while hiking tough mountains or the "community service" essay about how a student discovered, while working among disadvantaged peoples, that "all persons were the same". Admissions officers seek to learn how a person thinks, what kind of person they are, and their level of intellectual promise.

== Acceptances, rejections, and waitlists ==
=== Different application types ===
The most common application type is regular decision, in which students usually apply by January 1st, and are not making binding agreements to commit to the school if accepted. A second type is early action, which is very similar to regular decision, the only difference being that early action applicants often apply in November. There is also restrictive early action, where students must choose only one school to apply to early in any capacity. The most controversial admission type is early decision, when students enter into a binding agreement that, if accepted, they will attend the institution. This is controversial as detractors argue that, because they make this decision prior to learning of financial aid, it could benefit students who know that they will be able to pay the entire tuition.

2021 admit rates at selected highly selective schools (Note: A number of highly selective schools including Caltech did not announce admission rates in 2021. Many highly selective schools are not listed here.)
School	Appli cants	Over all	ED	EA	RD
Harvard	57,435	3.42%		7.4%	2.58%
Columbia	60,551	3.66%	15.0%		2.78%
Caltech	13,017	3.91%			
Stanford	55,471	3.95%			
Princeton	37,601	3.98%			3.98%
MIT	33,240	4.0%		4.8%	3.41%
Yale	46,905	4.62%		10.5%	3.42%
Brown	46,568	5.44%	15.9%		3.5%
Duke	49,517	5.76%	16.7%		4.28%
UPenn	56,333	5.68%	14.9%		4.15%
Dartmouth	28,357	6.17%	22.1%		4.5%
UChicago	37,986	6.33%	-	-	-
Pomona College	11,620	6.64%	12.8%	-	5.65%
Vanderbilt	47,174	6.70%	18.1%		5.3%
Northwestern	47,633	6.79%	-		-
Swarthmore	~13,000	~7.8%	-		-

=== Notifications ===
Regular decision applicants are notified usually in the last two weeks of March, and early decision or early action applicants are notified near the end of December (but early decision II notifications tend to be in February). The notification of the school's decision is either an admit, deny (reject), waitlist, or defer. Notifications as an online status update on an individual college’s application portal are becoming more common, although a few schools still send notifications by email or regular mail (in which case a "fat" envelope is usually an acceptance whereas a "thin" envelope is usually a rejection or waitlist).

Letters of admission typically require the admitted student to maintain good grades and good conduct before matriculation. Teachers and college counselors of seniors advise students against "senioritis". Schools do rescind admission if students have been dishonest in their application, have conducted themselves in a way deemed to be inconsistent with the values of the school, or do not heed warnings of poor academic performance; for example, one hundred high school applicants accepted to Texas Christian University, whose grades plummeted in the spring of their twelfth grade as a symptom of senioritis, received so-called "fear of God" letters from an admissions dean asking them to explain themselves and threatening to rescind offers of admission.

Admitted students may also be awarded financial aid and notification of this is made around the same time. Students who are dissatisfied with an aid offer can appeal for the offer to be improved.

International students who have been accepted will need to complete the necessary paperwork for visas (such as an I-20 form).

Rejection letters from most schools will mention that there is no appeal process but many schools, especially public universities such as the University of California, have a formal appeal process requiring "new and compelling" information from the appellant.

=== Wait list considerations ===
About half of schools use a wait list, particularly those that accept fewer than half of all applications. Schools use the wait list as an enrollment management tool because they are uncertain how many of their original admits will enroll, but the exact implementation varies widely among colleges. Some schools put a large number onto the wait list (relative to the class enrollment size) even though this puts many wait-listed students in "limbo" and gives most of them only false hope, the "basic equivalent of purgatory". With a class size of only around 2,500, Penn put 3,535 applicants on its wait list for the Class of 2022 (of whom 2,327 remained on the wait list) but accepted only 9. In the same year, Tulane put over 10,000 applicants on its wait list but admitted only 2. By contrast, the University of Oregon with a class size of 4,000 offered wait list status to only 264 and admitted 69 of them. However, many schools do lose a small number of admitted students due to a phenomenon sometimes called summer melt: students, even those have sent in a deposit, will not show up in the fall, and this "melt percentage" can be as high as 5% to 10% of persons who have paid a deposit.

The admission process is a complicated dance of supply and demand for colleges. And this spring, many institutions have accepted fewer applicants, and placed more on waiting lists, until it becomes clear over the next few weeks how many spots remain.

— Jacques Steinberg in The New York Times, April 2010

Wait list acceptances for selected schools Class of 2021 and 2022 to illustrate variability across schools and years Source: Annual Common Data Set of each school
College	Wait list offers Class of 2021	Wait list admits Class of 2021	Wait list offers Class of 2022	Wait list admits Class of 2022
Stanford	842	36	870	30
Princeton	1168	101	1125	0
Dartmouth	2021	0	1925	0
UPenn	3457	58	3535	9
CMC	723	1	1037	25
Tulane	5596	0	10384	2
Michigan	11094	468	14893	415
UNC	5097	35	4977	22
Wesleyan	2267	108	1965	0
CMU	5609	4	3677	109
Macalester	356	104	426	0
Cal Poly SLO	3168	15	6643	2436
UC Santa Barbara	6650	960	7856	14
UC Riverside	5499	321	11058	1143
Holy Cross	1109	0	1581	0
Oregon	134	73	264	69

== Transfer admissions ==
While most college admissions involves high school students applying to colleges, transfer admissions are important as well. Estimates of the percentage of college students who transfer vary from 20% to 33% to 60%, with the consensus position being around a third of college students transfer, and there are many indications that transfer activity is increasing. One report suggested that nearly half of all undergraduates in the nation were attending community colleges. Media coverage of student transfers is generally less than coverage of the high school to college transition. A common transfer path is students moving from two-year community colleges to four-year institutions, although there is considerable movement between four-year institutions. Reasons for transferring include unhappiness with campus life, cost, and course and degree selection. There are no consistent national rules for transfers, and requirements vary by college. Many community colleges have articulation agreements with four-year schools, particularly flagship state universities, so that matters such as the transfers of credits are handled appropriately. There are indications that many private colleges are more actively seeking transfer applicants. Still, transferring can be difficult; transfer students have been described in the past as "academic nomads".

== Criticism ==
College attendance, analyzed by race and schools' overall admission rates. Shown by comparative areas of upper four pie charts, elite schools make up a small fraction of all enrollment.

=== Selectivity and later success ===
Selective schools (especially highly selective schools like those in the Ivy League) have garnered a great deal of criticism regarding racial equity, the importance placed on the prestige or ranking of colleges, "holistic" admissions, and factors determining admissions. These issues affect a small percentage of college applicants, as roughly 3% of college applicants will matriculate at a college admitting less than half its applicants.

The selection criteria of highly-ranked colleges may be of little importance, as admittance to these schools may not affect later success.

On the one hand, most graduates of highly selective schools go on to lead moderately successful and fulfilling lives, but they do not become famous, influential, or extraordinarily wealthy. On the other hand, the extreme level of anxiety displayed by some applicants to highly selective schools and their parents has a rational basis, because there is a powerful correlation between graduation from a highly selective school and going on to a life full of exceptional achievement. A 2024 descriptive study systematically analyzed the educational backgrounds of members of "30 different achievement groups totaling 26,198 people" and found that most groups were overwhelmingly dominated by graduates of 34 elite higher education institutions, especially Harvard University. The only two groups where graduates of elite institutions were not overwhelmingly dominant (but still formed a significant percentage) were four-star generals and four-star admirals. As part of the same study, a survey was carried out of 1,810 people, and the participants consistently underestimated the percentages of nearly every achievement group who had attended an elite institution.

=== Litigation ===
In 2018, there was a probe by the Department of Justice into whether colleges practicing Early Admissions violated antitrust laws by sharing information about applicants. The case Students for Fair Admissions v. President and Fellows of Harvard College proceeded to trial, alleging that Harvard's race-conscious admissions practices discriminate against Asians and putting affirmative action in the context of college admissions again into the judicial arena. In 2019, there was a notable admissions scandal in which affluent parents used unfair methods to get their children into competitive schools, involving cheating on standardized tests as well as bribes paid to college coaches and admissions personnel.

=== Wealth ===
Ivy-Plus admissions rates vary with the income of the students' parents, with the acceptance rate of the top 0.1% income percentile being almost twice as much as other students.

While many "elite" colleges intend to improve socioeconomic diversity by admitting poorer students, they may have economic incentives not to do so. Colleges are incentivized to admit students who are able to pay full tuition without aid. Additionally, college rankings, which have an effect on the students applying each year, penalize poor average standardized testing scores; colleges therefore admit students with higher scores, who are typically also richer.

Wealthier applicants also benefit from other advantages, like test-prep courses, private schools, international travel, and extracurricular activities, such as in athletics and music.

=== Evaluation of candidate's personality ===
Many universities choose to evaluate applicants based on subjective factors such as an admissions essay or letters of recommendation. This has been the source of disagreement, with detractors arguing that colleges lack the authority and knowledge to judge students according to personal characteristics, and that high schoolers should not be put under the impression that failure to gain admission is a critique of their personality. Critics also argue that holistic admissions is intended to justify selection that seems otherwise random, or otherwise biased towards wealth and race.

The weighing of certain personality traits in analyzing a student has also become the subject of debate. For example, many highly-ranked schools state that they hold leadership qualities in high regard. To portray "leadership", students may feel the need to collect political positions without considering whether they're truly interested in the roles. Furthermore, according to Helen Vendler, a former Harvard professor, Harvard's focus on qualities such as leadership, service, and scientific interest is unlikely to attract future artists and writers.

== See also ==
- College tour
- Cooling out
- FAFSA position
- Hidden Ivies
- Ivy League
- National Association for College Admission Counseling
- Need-blind admission
- Open-door academic policy
- Rolling admission
- Senioritis
- Student financial aid in the United States
- The Early Admissions Game
- Transfer admissions in the United States
- University and college admission
- First-generation college students in the United States
