= Undermatching =

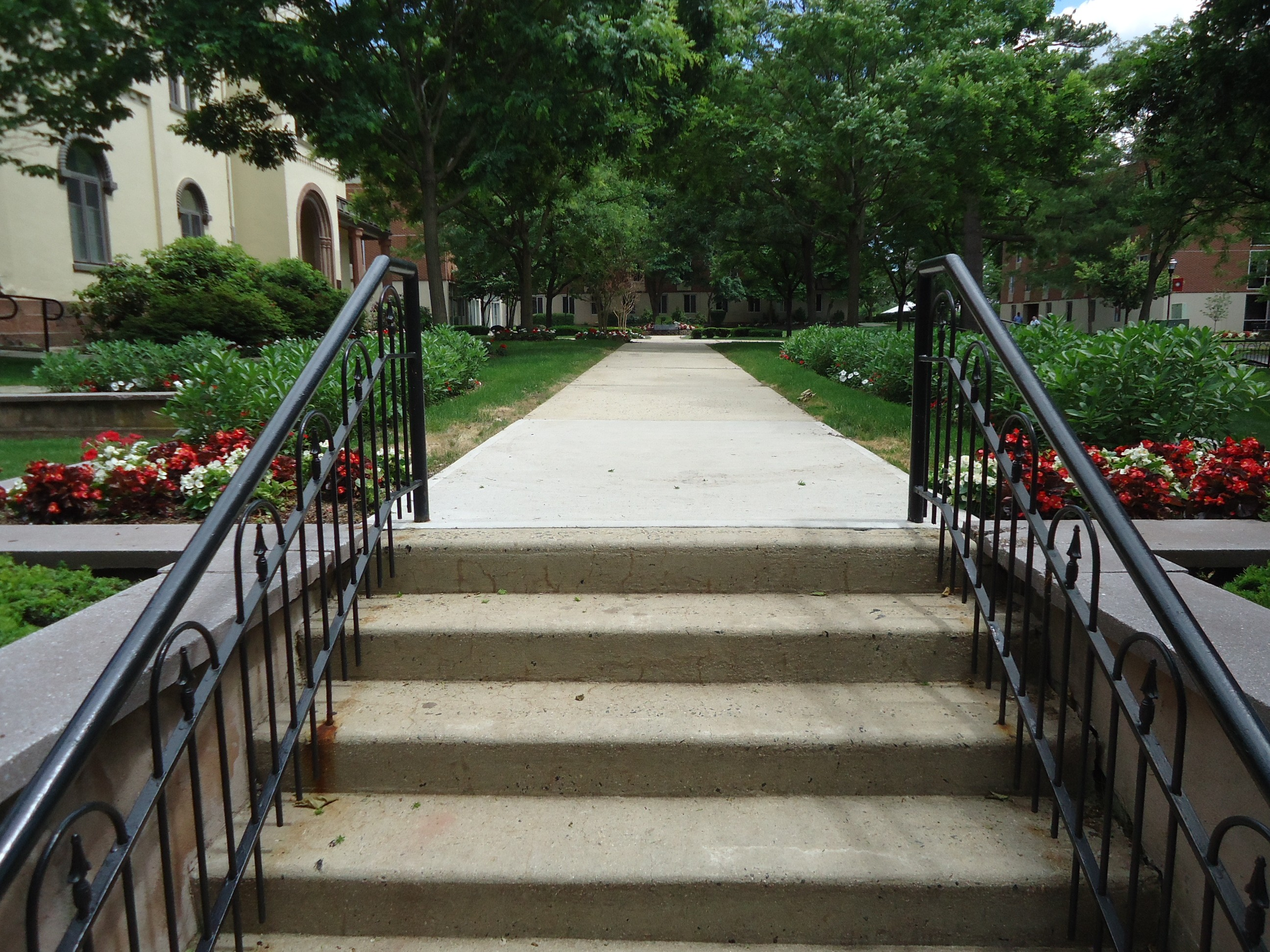
Undermatching is a phenomenon in which well-qualified low-income students do not apply to colleges they are academically qualified for, such as elite competitive colleges or state flagship universities, like Rutgers University in New Jersey; instead, they apply to less challenging schools or do not attend college at all.

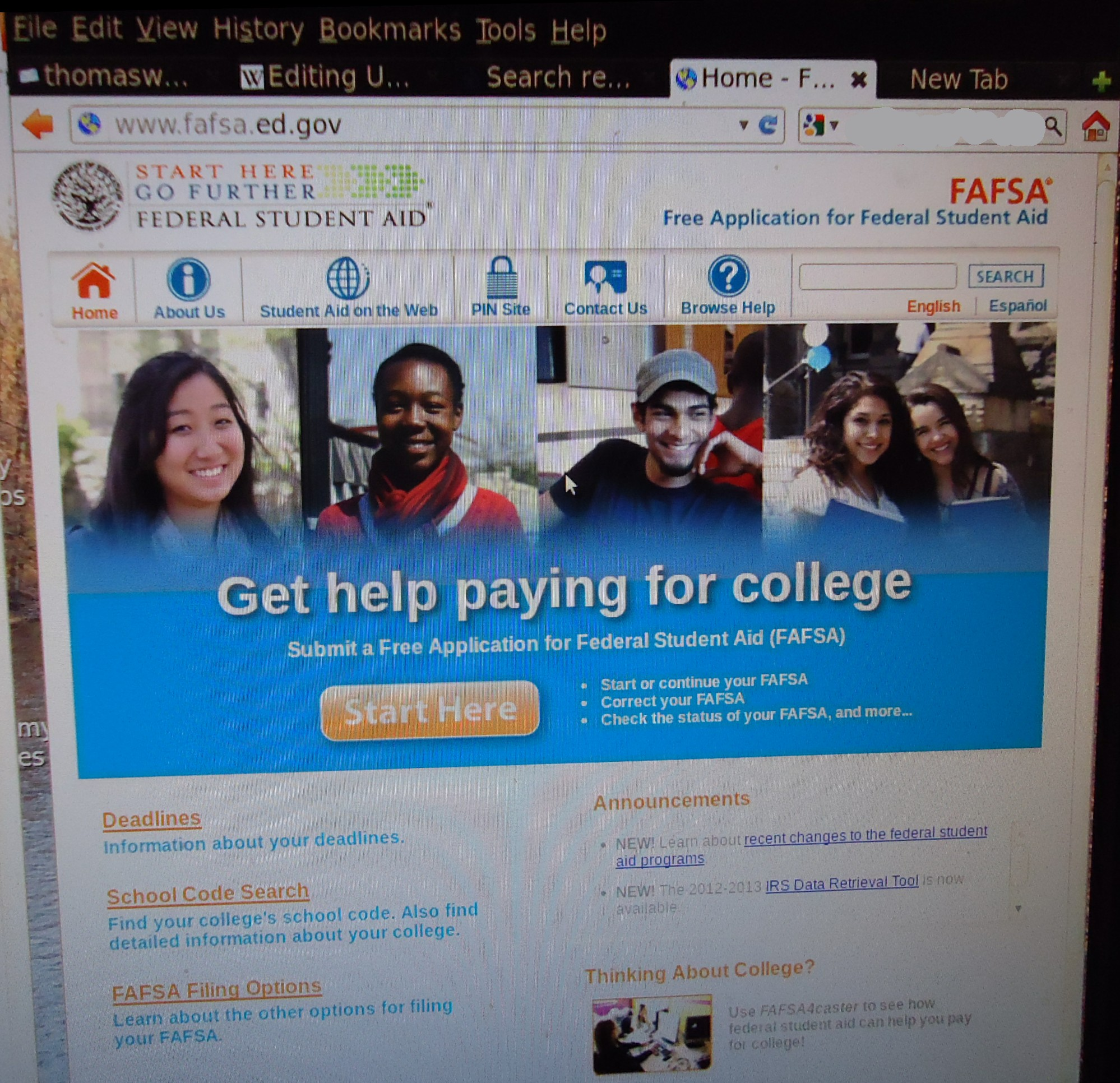
Many low-income high-caliber school-leavers do not realize the extent of financial aid opportunities that there are in higher education, and do not complete the Free Application for Federal Student Aid or FAFSA form.

Undermatching is a phenomenon in American higher education in which well-qualified students, often from less affluent households, do not apply to competitive colleges. Instead, undermatched students often attend less-demanding colleges such as two-year colleges or don't attend college at all. Undermatching is considered as a serious issue in higher education, and it is getting increased attention from education researchers and policymakers. Undermatching can affect long-term economic inequality and social mobility, and it can negatively affect college graduation rates.

== Causes ==
Researchers have explained undermatching to be the result of an "information gap". Students from low-income households are unaware of the numerous opportunities for financial aid. through programs like the Free Application for Federal Student Aid (FAFSA), as well as individual scholarships offered by colleges or community programs. Students are deterred by high sticker prices on elite colleges and choose not to apply, selecting less selective universities or community colleges as an alternative.

The information gap extends further than just financial aid. Often, undermatched students are simply unaware of the process for applying to selective universities, whether that be the Common Application or completing standardized testing like the ACT or SAT. This information gap means undermatched students don't know what they don't know, and choose not to apply to selective institutions as they do not receive guidance on post-secondary planning and career aspirations.

== Symptoms ==
While estimates vary, the numbers of undermatched students in the United States are considerable. One estimate is that only a third of high-achieving students from the bottom quartile of income distribution attended any of the 238 "most selective" colleges. Another estimate is that 28% of college students are undermatched and could have attended a more rigorous institution, while 25% may be overmatched or "in over their heads". An overall estimate is that each year there are 400,000 low-income well-qualified high school graduates who do not enroll in college, and that there are an additional 200,000 who are in college but undermatched. Many undermatched students are African-American or Latinos, and generally come from poor or less affluent backgrounds. Researchers have noticed that undermatched students are more likely to report fewer self-perceived gains from their education, and have less educational satisfaction on average, although they had more frequent meetings with faculty and were more likely to participate in collaborative learning projects, according to one study. They are less likely on average to graduate from college.

== Attempted Solutions ==
After its introduction to researchers in 2012, many attempts at undermatching have been made, yet they have not significantly reduced the effect of undermatching on low-income students.

The University of Texas system introduced a policy where the top 10% of public school graduates within the state of Texas were guaranteed admission, given a complete and on-time application. The state believed that by doing this, it would encourage more students to apply to state flagship instituions and encourage students to perform better in high school. Despite their efforts, the number of low-income students who applied and enrolled at flagship institutions in Texas didnot significantly change after the policy's introduction. This effect was especially pronounced for Hispanic students in Texas, who consistently undermatched at the highest rates.

Nationwide programs such as QuestBridge have also been introduced to curb undermatching. QuestBridge aims to match high-achieving low-income students into selective colleges with a full-tuition scholarship. After receiving expanded funding in 2012, QuestBridge grew its number f partner schools to nearly 40 in 2025. With this many partner schools, however, a link between low-income applications and low-income admissions to selective colleges has not yet been realized. Researchers attribute this to the fact that QuestBridge has merely re-routed applications from low-income students who were always planning on applying to selective schools, rather than introducing low-income students who were not planning on applying to selective schools.

One attempted solution that did increase the number of low-income applications to selective universities was a 2013 study in which two researchers mailed application fee waivers, guidance on choosing the correct school, and estimated full cost-of-attendance information to incoming high school seniors. Through this process, the researchers claimed that the solutions to undermatching must come from individualized treatment of each student, rather than extensive, national programs.

== See also ==
- College admissions in the United States
- Higher education in the United States
