= Overqualification =

State of being educated beyond the needs of a particular job

Overqualification is the state of being educated beyond what is necessary or requested by an employer for a position with the business. There can often be high costs for companies associated with training employees. This could be problematic for candidates resulting in failure to secure employment for the position in question. Employers foresee costs related to hiring such “overqualified” candidates. When seeking employment, candidates should consider providing explanation to potential employers as to why they are seeking a position that requires less skill, education and therefore less pay than their education and experience qualify the candidate for.

== As a euphemism ==
The concept of overqualification is often a euphemism used by employers when they do not want to reveal their true reasons for not hiring an applicant. The term "overqualified" can mask age discrimination, but it can also mask legitimate concerns of an employer, such as uncertainty of an applicant's ability to do the job, or concerns that they only want a job on a temporary basis, while they seek another more desirable position. Being overqualified also often means that a person was asking for too high a salary. "Overqualified" can also be used to describe a resistance to new technologies, or a pompous approach.

In the definition above, which states that an overqualified person may take a job to gain knowledge and leave the company, this could also apply to all other employees of the same company. The term overqualified, in any definition, should be considered as a subjective term developed by the person doing the evaluation of the applicant based upon their point of view which may in itself be biased. An overqualified applicant, willing to take a lower-level, lower salaried position may bring "added value", with formal education and training bringing a culture change to a stagnant organisation, or providing management with options to 'adjust' their workforce. When the decision to reject an application is not based upon factual or unbiased factors, discrimination has occurred.

In the United States, the term "overqualified" has been found by the courts to sometimes be used as a "code word for too old" (i.e., age discrimination) in the hiring process.

== Protecting less qualified candidates ==
Governmental employing institutions may have written or unwritten upper qualification limits for a particular position. These limits protect less qualified people like newly graduated students, allowing them to find a job. For instance, in countries like Germany or Switzerland, a paid position of a PhD student may normally not be given for an applicant who already has a PhD degree. In November 2020, the Supreme Court of India ruled that a bank could dismiss an employee who had concealed his academic degree, although in this case the bank specifically stated in its job advertisement that graduates were "not eligible to apply".

== Responses to being described as overqualified ==
Noluthando Crockett-Ntonga recommends that job applicants address potential concerns such as salary requirements in a cover letter and interview before the employer makes any comments about overqualification. Barbara Moses advises applicants who are described as being overqualified to emphasize their willingness to mentor younger co-workers, and to focus on what attracts them about the position they are applying to rather than emphasizing their ambition or desire to be challenged. Being overqualified can be an asset for employers, especially when the breadth of one's experience enables them to take on additional responsibilities in ways that benefit the employer.

== Education alleged as a factor of over-qualification ==
It might be alleged that a PhD reflects overspecialization that manifests itself as a lack of perspective; for example, a PhD might not adequately prepare one for careers in development, manufacturing, or technical management.

In the corporate world, some PhD graduates have been criticized as being unable to turn theories into useful strategies and being unable to work on a team, although PhDs are seen as desirable and even essential in many positions, such as supervisory roles in research, especially PhDs in biomedical sciences.

Even in some college jobs, people can associate negative factors with the PhD, including a lack of focus on teaching, overspecialization, and an undesirable set of professional priorities, often focusing on self-promotion. These forces have led both to an increase in some educational institutions hiring candidates without PhDs as well as a focus on the development of other doctoral degrees, such as the D.A. or Doctor of Arts.

Some employers have reservations about hiring people with PhDs in full-time, entry-level positions but are eager to hire them in temporary positions.

Some argue that this reservation is rather a reaction associated with job insecurity, especially in situations where most of the company leaders hold lower qualifications than the PhD; as part of the wide phenomenon of credential creep.

== See also ==
- Involuntary unemployment
- Overengineering
- Underemployment
- Yield protection
