= FAFSA =

Form to determine eligibility for US student financial aid

The Free Application for Federal Student Aid (FAFSA, pronounced /fæfsə/) is a form completed by current and prospective college students (undergraduate and graduate) in the United States to determine their eligibility for student financial aid.

The FAFSA is different from CSS Profile (short for "College Scholarship Service Profile"), which is also required by some colleges (primarily private ones). The CSS is a fee-based product of the College Board (a private non-profit organization) and is used by the colleges to distribute their own institutional funds, rather than federal or state funding.

== Eligibility ==
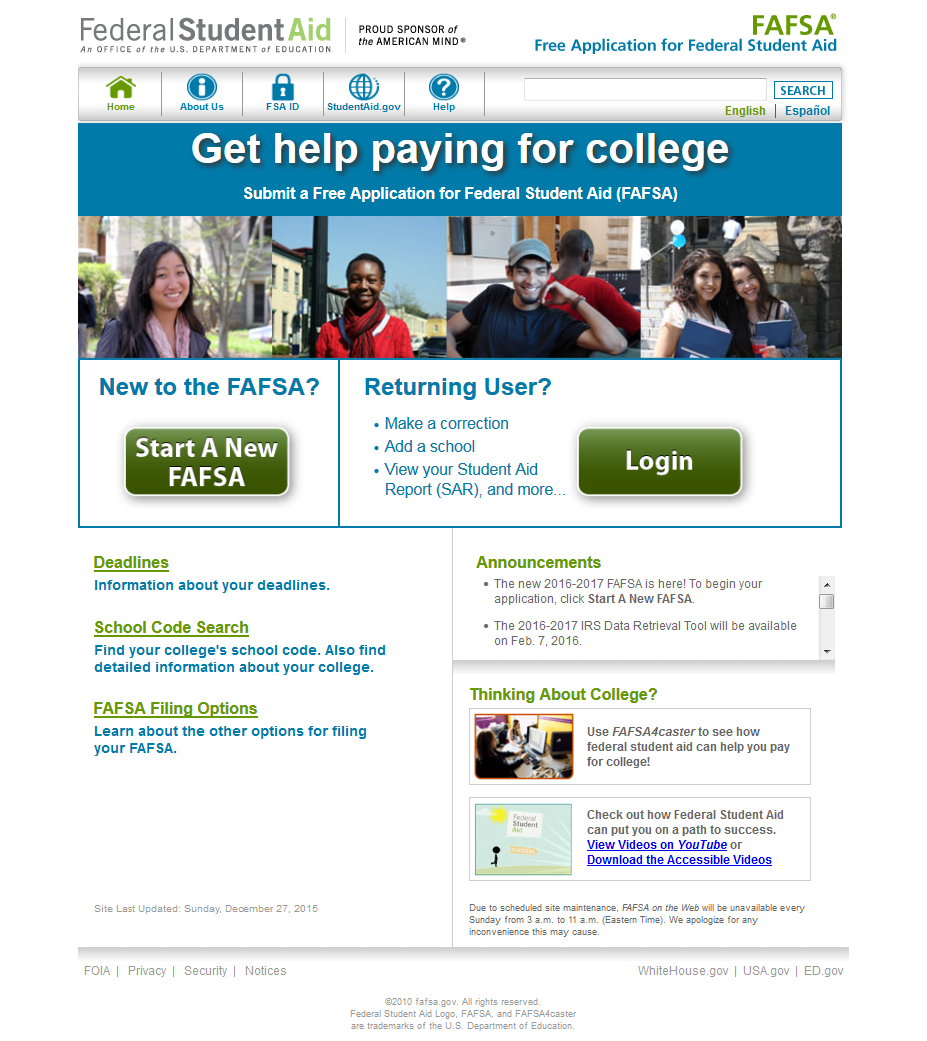
The official FAFSA website is studentaid.gov.

In order to receive federal student financial aid, students must meet the following criteria:

- have maintained a Satisfactory Academic Progress (SAP);
- be a U.S. citizen, a U.S. national, or an eligible non-citizen;
- have a valid Social Security number;
- have a high school diploma or GED;
- have signed the certification statement stating that: 1) they are not in default on a federal student loan and do not owe money on a federal student grant and 2) federal student aid will only be used for educational purposes;
- have not been found guilty of the sale or possession of illegal drugs while federal aid was being received. (This restriction was removed with the 2024 FAFSA.)

Male students between the ages of 18 and 25 were generally required be registered with the Selective Service System (for Conscription in the United States), but the FAFSA Simplification Act removed this requirement starting with the 2021–2022 school year. The FAFSA Simplification Act was a part of the Consolidated Appropriations Act, 2021.

Students who are military veterans and active duty service members may apply for financial aid by filing a FAFSA even if they also apply for education and housing benefits offered by the Post-9/11 G.I. Bill and its accompanying Yellow Ribbon program. The amount of military aid a student receives for a college education does not defer eligibility or reduce the amount of student aid that student could receive from the four federal grant programs – Pell, SMART, FSEOG, and TEACH – and many of the state student aid programs.

Student Aid and Fiscal Responsibility Act (SAFRA) of 2010 changed the criteria for suspension of eligibility for drug-related offenses. Previously, students could lose eligibility for either the possession or sale of a controlled substance during the period of enrollment. SAFRA dropped the penalties for possession of a controlled substance but retained the penalties for sale of a controlled substance. SAFRA increases the suspension to two years for a first offense and indefinite for a second offense.

Most students who are eligible to receive federal aid and complete the FAFSA will receive some form of financial aid regardless of their financial need.

== Preparation and filing options ==
The FAFSA is made available to the public on October 1 every year for the future academic year. This timing allows a student's financial aid application process to align with the typical college application process. The October 1 availability date has been required by law since the FAFSA Deadline Act in 2024; the Department of Education had begun releasing the FAFSA on this date in the 2017–2018 academic year. The 2016–2017 academic year was the final one in which the FAFSA was not made available until January 1.

Two-year old US tax information, aka "prior-prior tax year" information, is used to complete the financial sections of the FAFSA. This enables families to use the IRS Data Retrieval Tool in the FAFSA to quickly verify their tax information. Some financial aid is provided on a first-come, first-served basis, and students are encouraged to submit a FAFSA as soon as possible.

According to the U.S. Department of Education's website, students have three options for filling out the form:

- online at studentaid.gov (Other websites such as fafsa.com, fafsa.net, may appear to be official but most of these sites charge a fee for assistance) (FAFSA stands for the Free application For Federal Student Aid so no other website should be used other than the official one listed above)
- in the myStudentAid mobile app
- Call 1-800-433-3243 to obtain a PDF of the form

The Higher Education Opportunity Act of 2008 authorized fee-based FAFSA preparation. By law, fee-based FAFSA preparation services must on initial contact with students inform them of the free option and be transparent about their non-affiliation with the U.S. Department of Education and their fees.

== Application process ==
Applicants complete the FAFSA by providing their demographic and financial information and, in many cases, the demographic and financial information of their parents/guardians. In addition to this demographic and financial information, applicants can list up to ten schools to receive the results of the application once it is processed. Historically, there was some concern that colleges could deny admission, waitlist applicants, or offer less financial aid as a result of the order in which applicants list schools on the application, or FAFSA position. However, the US Department of Education changed the FAFSA for the 2016–2017 academic year to prevent schools from having access to view other schools that may be listed on the application.

After completing the FAFSA, students are presented with a Student Aid Report (SAR). The SAR provides a student with their potential eligibility for different types of financial aid, their Expected Family Contribution (EFC), and a summary of the data a student provided in the application. An electronic version of the SAR (called an ISIR) is made available to the colleges/universities the student includes on the FAFSA. The ISIR is also sent to state agencies that award need-based aid.

Students can file an appeal with their college financial aid office in order to seek additional financial aid if their current financial situation is no longer the same as the financial information they provided on FAFSA (i.e. their parent recently lost their job). The exact appeal process can vary from school to school. SwiftStudent, a free service, provides template letters for college students to use when appealing their financial aid.

Currently, students can only list ten schools on their FAFSA application. If students are applying to more than 10 colleges or universities, there are three options they can choose from that allow them to submit their FAFSA application to additional schools.

== Types of federal financial aid ==
Federal Student Aid offers several different types of financial aid programs.

- Pell Grant – A grant of up to $6,195 (as of the 2019–2020 Award Year) for students with a low expected family contribution. A 2018 NerdWallet study found that students missed out on $2.6 billion in free federal Pell grants by not completing the FAFSA.
- Federal Supplemental Educational Opportunity Grant (FSEOG) – A grant between $100 – $4,000 for eligible students and the award is available for Undergraduate students. This grant money is limited at colleges and universities and usually is given to those who have completed their FAFSA application early and are eligible to receive this grant.
- Federal Direct Subsidized Loan – Part of the Federal Direct Student Loan Program, Federal Direct Subsidized loans are need-based loans whose interest is paid by the government while the student is enrolled at least half time. Direct Subsidized Loans have fixed interest rates for the life-time of the loan. The interest rates for new loans are set yearly by the U.S. Congress.
- Federal Direct Unsubsidized Loan - Part of the Federal Direct Student Loan Program, Federal Direct Unsubsidized Loans are not need-based, meaning that nearly all students are eligible to receive them. Unlike Federal Direct Subsidized Loans, Direct Unsubsidized Loans accrue interest the moment they are applied to a student's tuition account. Similar to Direct Subsidized Loans, Direct Unsubsidized Loans have fixed interest rates that are set yearly by the U.S. Congress.
- The Federal Work-Study Program – An employment program that encourages students with low expected family contributions to find part-time work while pursuing their studies. The program allows the federal government to subsidize a student's employer by paying around half of the student's wages up to a certain amount. Students do not need to have Federal Work Study to work but some university or non-profit positions may require a student to have Federal Work Study in order to be employed.

== History ==
FAFSA originally came from the Higher Education Act of 1965 by President Lyndon B. Johnson, which established that the United States Government would be the primary provider of financial aid for students. For years, the application was called Financial Aid Form (FAF), which was an optional form used by some—but not all—colleges and universities. When Congress reauthorized the Higher Education Act in 1992, they created a standardized federal form for all prospective students seeking aid. The stated goal of FAFSA and other government funded education programs was to create equal opportunities for students seeking higher education. When the Higher Education Act was reauthorized again in 2008 lawmakers added a clause that schools must report information about who is receiving financial aid. Subsequent studies revealed continued inequality for students of color, who often had to take out more student loans than more privileged counterparts.

Recent updates have been made to increase accessibility of financial aid. The original FAFSA form had 108 questions, which was a significant barrier for many low-income families seeking financial aid. The questions were broadly seen as excessively detailed and unnecessarily complicated, with students being required to dedicate several hours to completing their application. The Consolidated Appropriations Act, 2021 shortened the FAFSA from 108 questions to 36, to encourage more eligible students to fill out the form. In addition, students now have the option to link their IRS account with their FAFSA account to make the application simpler to complete accurately. Students must now report the value of their family business or farm. The Consolidated Appropriations Act also opened financial aid eligibility to students that had previously been excluded from the program. More than 14 Million applications were submitted in 2006.

=== 2024 changes ===
In 2024, the Department of Education made substantial changes to FAFSA in response to the FAFSA Simplification Act of 2020. Some of these changes were initially plagued with technical errors and glitches, causing significant delays in the release of data to colleges and universities and considerable confusion and frustration among parents and students. Students from disadvantaged groups and low-income backgrounds, among others, were disproportionately impacted by the technical obstacles due to their relatively lower level of access to resources.

On February 12, 2024, 108 Congress members sent an official letter to Education Secretary Miguel Cardona, requesting his attention on the issues with the changes to FAFSA. The letter noted that delays in processing of financial aid most severely impact students from disadvantaged and low-income backgrounds. Among the signatories were Senator Bernie Sanders, at the time the Chairman of the Senate Committee on Health, Education, Labor, and Pensions, and Representative Bobby Scott, at the time a ranking member of the House Committee on Education and the Workforce. The problems with the FAFSA resulted in a congressional hearing where witnesses reported that the multiple errors and delays in releasing data to colleges and universities could significantly diminish enrollment. In response to this situation, Richard Cordray, the Department of Education employee in charge of Federal Student Aid, resigned at the end of June 2024.

=== 2025 ===
For the 2025–26 academic year, the FAFSA form opened on November 21, 2024, ahead of the initially planned December 1 release. This early launch was part of the Department of Education's effort to avoid delays similar to those that affected the 2024–25 cycle, and to provide additional time for applicants navigating the overhauled form.

In February 2025, the Department of Education announced that the FAFSA form would be altered to no longer allow students to identify as nonbinary. The change is being made to comply with the executive order issued by Donald Trump that defines gender as a strict male-female binary.

Many upcoming students refer to FAFSA checklists and tips so they can be prepared for college.

== See also ==
- College admissions in the United States
- CSS Profile
- FAFSA position (only relevant prior to the 2016–2017 academic year)
- Transfer admissions in the United States
