= College cost calculator =

Online calculation tool

A college cost calculator, in the United States, is an online tool allowing students and their parents to calculate how much college is likely to cost. Numbers are input into the online calculator, and if done properly, it gives an estimate of the likely expenses for that student attending that particular college.

Since the actual costs for most college and university students are discounted substantially, most students do not pay the list or "sticker price", but rather pay an amount discounted by grants and scholarships and other forms of aid. While the discrepancy between sticker price and actual price allows colleges to make specific offers to individual students, the system has been criticized for causing much confusion for parents and students wondering how much, in fact, college will cost. Accordingly, the federal government passed the Higher Education Opportunity Act of 2008 which required all universities to have a net price calculator located on their websites by October 29, 2011. Students and parents can go online to a college's website, find the calculator, and input numbers such as the family's income, the student's grades and test scores, and other information, and the calculator is supposed to provide an estimate of how much it will cost that particular student to go to that particular college. It is an estimate only. And the accuracy of the estimates will vary depending on such factors as whether parents and students understand the right numbers to input, the simplicity of the tool, and so forth. Each college is in charge of developing and maintaining their own calculators.

== Non-tuition costs ==
Typical costs for attending college in the US, 2023–2024 school year
	Tuition and fees	Housing and food
Community college	$3,990	$9,970
In-state students	$11,260	$12,770
Out-of-state students	$29,150	$12,770
Private colleges	$41,540	$14,650

The actual cost of attending college encompasses more than just tuition. It includes multiple expenses such as housing, meals, textbooks, transportation, personal expenses, and possibly more. For most students in the US, the cost of living away from home, whether in a dorm room or by renting an apartment, exceeds the cost of tuition and fees.

The College Cost Calculator allows users to input various costs associated with their prospective college or university. Some advanced calculators might even factor in potential financial aid, scholarships, and grants, giving a more accurate picture of the net cost.

== Calculators ==
Some calculators are general, while others are specific to an institution. The latter often provides more accurate estimates because they use the actual costs associated with that particular institution.

A recent report issued by The Institute for College Access and Success, "“Adding it all up 2012: are net price calculators easy to find, use and compare?”, found key issues with the implementation of the net price calculator requirement. In “Adding it all up,” the authors state, “this report takes a more in-depth look at the net price calculators from 50 randomly selected colleges. While we found some positive practices that were not evident at the time of our previous report, net price calculators are still not reliably easy for prospective college students and their families to find, use, and compare”.

After the requirement came into effect, Abigail Seldin and Whitney Haring-Smith launched the free website College Abacus, which hosted a system that would allow students to enter the personal information once, and then use and compare net-prices of multiple schools. The Gates Foundation's College Challenge announced College Abacus as one its winners in January 2013; the $100,000 grant from the Gates Foundation will enable College Abacus to expand from its beta version with 2500+ schools to a fully comprehensive version with all the colleges and universities in the United States.

The sticker prices of colleges in the United States have increased more than eight percent between 2010 and 2011. College tuition has increased at a faster pace than inflation since at least 1992.

== See also ==
- College admissions in the United States
- Student financial aid in the United States
- Transfer admissions in the United States
