= Application essay =

Essay written by a university applicant

An admissions or application essay, sometimes also called a personal statement or a statement of purpose, is an essay or other written statement written by an applicant, often a prospective student applying to some college, university, or graduate school. The application essay is a common part of the university and college admissions process.

In the context of academic admissions, there are key distinctions between a statement of purpose, a personal statement, and an application essay. A statement of purpose is a formal essay that outlines an applicant's career goals and reasons for choosing a specific field of study or program. It often includes a tentative research plan and highlights relevant experience and accomplishments. A personal statement, on the other hand, is more personal and introspective. It provides insight into an applicant's motivations, values, and life experiences, often demonstrating their character and passion for their chosen field. An application essay, while similar to the other two, is typically broader and may cover a range of topics. It might ask applicants to reflect on their past experiences, discuss a significant event, or express their thoughts on a given topic. The objective of this essay is to assess the applicant's writing skills, critical thinking, and ability to articulate their thoughts coherently.

Some applications may require one or more essays to be completed, while others make essays optional or supplementary. Essay topics range from very specific to open-ended.

== United States ==
The Common Application, used for undergraduate admissions by many American colleges and universities, requires a general admissions essay, in addition to any supplemental admissions essays required by member institutions. The Common Application offers students six admissions essay prompts from which to choose. According to Uni in the USA, the Common Application essay is intended as a chance to describe "things that are unique, interesting and informative about yourself".

The University of Chicago is known for its unusual essay prompts in its undergraduate admissions application, including "What would you do with a foot-and-a-half-tall jar of mustard"?

Recently, many colleges have started to use short-answer responses instead of full-length essays. In 2023, Harvard replaced its long supplemental essay requirement with five 200-word short answer responses. Harvard cited the need to know more broadly about applicants' backgrounds following a Supreme Court ruling banning the use of race as a factor for admissions. Other highly-selective schools like USC, Princeton, Columbia, Stanford, and Yale have followed suit. Some colleges such as Williams and Amherst have eliminated supplemental writing from their applications entirely, instead giving students a choice to optionally submit an example of their academic writing.

A 2021 study in Science Advances found that the content of the admission essays submitted to University of California had stronger correlations to self-reported household income than did SAT scores.

While admission essays' prompts are varied and leave room for creativity, they may unintentionally be misleading, potentially widening the achievement gap between lower-income, minority students and their higher-income peers by perpetuating an "undemocratic curriculum" that favors students already familiar with implicit academic expectations.

== United Kingdom ==
A personal statement is part of an application sent to UCAS by a prospective student at a UK university. In a personal statement, the student writes about what they hope to achieve in a UK university course, what they hope to do after the course and why they are applying to this particular university.

== See also ==
- College admissions in the United States § Essays
- College application
