= Summer melt =

Phenomenon in university enrollment

Summer melt is the phenomenon of prospective college students' motivation to attend college "melting" away during the summer between the end of high school and beginning of college.

This phenomenon is especially prevalent in low-income minority communities, where students who qualify for college and in some cases even register for classes ultimately end up not attending college because they lack resources, support, guidance, and encouragement.

Support programs by colleges, such as introduction of peer mentoring programs, and using nudge methods like messaging students via text message, have been found to reduce summer melt.
