= Yield protection =

Alleged admissions practice

Yield protection is an alleged admissions practice in which an academic institution rejects or delays the acceptance of highly qualified students on the grounds that such students are likely to be accepted by, and then enroll in, more selective institutions. The purpose of the practice is to increase yield, a statistic that reflects the proportion of students that accept their admissions offer.

Some critics of the theory hold that it is a myth propagated by anxious college applicants to cope with rejection. This view proposes that, rather than yield protection, it is actually negative subjective factors in an application that may contribute to a rejection, despite the applicant's strong qualifications.

== See also ==
- College admissions in the United States
- Matriculation
