= Yield (college admissions) =

Percent of admitted students who enroll

Yield (also known as the yield rate or matriculation rate) is a statistic in college admissions that measures the percentage of applicants to an institution who, having been offered admission, accept the offer. It is calculated by dividing the number of students who enroll at an institution in a given year by the total number of admission offers sent. For example, an institution that makes 5,000 offers of admission in a particular year, but that enrolls 2,000 students that year, is said to have a yield of 40%. The yield rate is usually calculated once per year.

== Purpose ==
As a statistical measure, yield has been used by college ratings services as a measure of selectivity, such that a higher yield rate is a sign of a more selective college. It is also taken to indicate greater interest from applicants in enrolling at a particular institution. For example, the yield rate for Princeton University was 69% in 2016, while the yield rate for Dartmouth was 55%, and the yield rate for Colorado College was 37%.

=== Manipulation ===
The yield rate has sometimes been criticized for being subject to manipulation by college admissions staffs; in 2001, a report by Daniel Golden in The Wall Street Journal suggested that some college admissions departments reject or wait list well-qualified applicants on the assumption that they will not enroll, as a way to boost the college's overall yield rate. According to the report, these actions were part of an effort to improve a college's scores on the U.S. News college ranking. This practice is known as yield protection.
