= Wait list =

Potential college place pending a vacancy

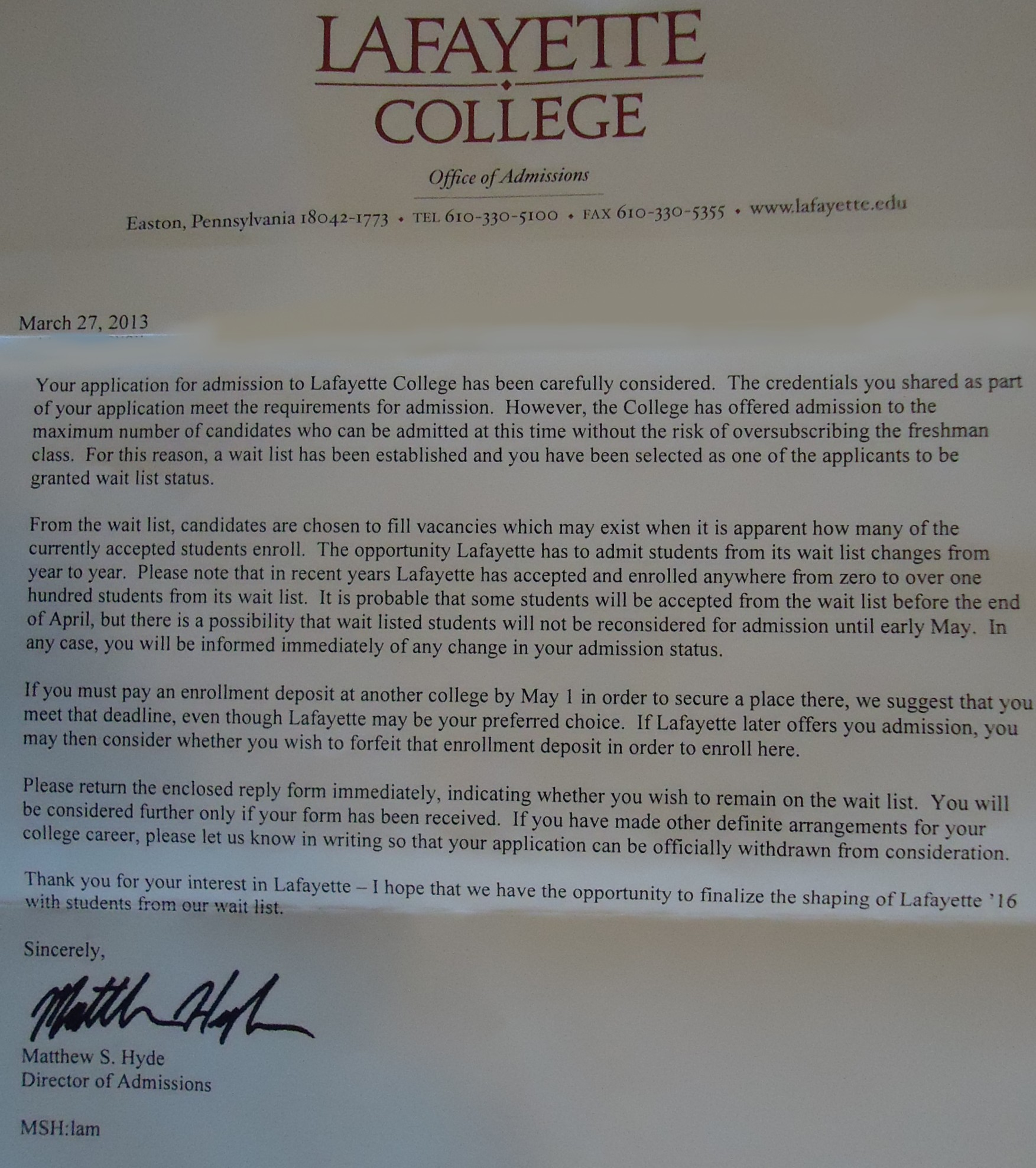
Colleges use waitlists to hedge their bets, uncertain about how many accepted students will say yes, and to draw applicants from the waitlist when vacancies open. In addition, waitlists allow colleges to target acceptance letters to students likely to attend to maintain the college's selectivity ranking and yield.

Wait list, in university and college admissions is a list of students who have not been formally accepted for admission but may be offered a spot in subsequent months if space becomes available. Colleges offer students a contingent offer to manage their "admission yield," the percentage of admitted students who choose to enroll. Waitlisting is common at selective colleges and universities, allowing them to hedge against uncertainty regarding how many students will accept their offers of admission.

== Mechanics of waitlisting ==
In the United States, colleges usually send offers of acceptance and rejections for students applying for regular admissions in April. Students accepting admission send in a deposit guaranteeing their spot in the fall.

Instead of sending a rejection, some colleges accept students on a wait list. In May, after receiving deposits from accepted students, colleges know how many spots will be open, and will usually begin to offer admission to students on their wait lists as positions become open. Students can be offered admission from the wait list during May and June and throughout the summer.

Colleges mailing out wait list offers generally advise students to reserve a spot at a college they have been accepted to by sending in a deposit, to guarantee that the student will have a place at any college in the fall. Students who subsequently accept a wait list offer sacrifice their earlier deposit to the other school.

Of the students on a wait list at a highly selective school, a fraction may be offered admission before classes begin in late August or September. One report said the fraction of wait-listed students who were eventually offered admission––as an average of all students wait listed in a given year––was 30%, but this is an overall average, and the fraction of wait-listed applicants to prestigious universities, who are eventually admitted, is much less. Students who are wait-listed may take steps to improve their chances of admission from a wait list by writing letters of interest and by sending second-semester senior grades.

Wait listed students are ranked by the admissions department in terms of overall desirability, based on the college's estimation of admissions criteria, and more highly ranked waitlisted students are offered admission first when spots open; this ranking is not revealed to the public.

== Strategic use ==
Colleges and universities use wait lists to try to hedge their guesses about how many students will ultimately decide to accept their offers of admission in any given academic year, with the idea being to build "a reservoir of qualified students to draw from to replace successful applicants who choose to go elsewhere." If fewer students say yes, then colleges will often go to their wait lists to try to find replacements. In 2010, according to one source, roughly 10% of college applicants were put on a wait list.

Wait lists tend to be used by elite and selective universities as well as second-tier liberal arts colleges who are uncertain about how many students will show up in the fall; for example, Stanford and Yale put 1,000 students on their wait lists and Duke put 3,000 on their wait list, according to one report in 2010. Amherst takes 35 students from the 1,000 students on its wait list. And as a general rule, selective colleges and universities will usually have some form of wait list.

== Yields and wait list acceptances ==
Yields and Wait List Offers

College/University	Yield (2024)	Wait List Offers (2024)	Wait List Acceptances (2024)	Notes/Source
Harvard	83%	~2,000	27	Harvard CDS 2023-24
Stanford	79%	~1,400	37	Stanford CDS 2023-24
Yale	70%	~1,000	46	Yale CDS 2023-24
Princeton	68%	~1,300	23	Princeton CDS 2023-24
University of Pennsylvania	66%	~3,000	57	UPenn CDS 2023-24
Dartmouth	62%	~2,500	51	Dartmouth CDS 2023-24
Cornell	60%	~6,000	192	Cornell CDS 2023-24
Amherst	43%	~1,000	18	Amherst CDS 2023-24
Lafayette	28%	~1,100	37	Lafayette CDS 2023-24
UNC Chapel Hill	44%	~2,800	82	UNC CDS 2023-24
University of Iowa	23%	~1,500	0	Iowa CDS 2023-24
Connecticut College	19%	~900	11	Conn College CDS 2023-24
Colorado College	36%	~1,200	24	Colorado College CDS 2023-24

== Definitions ==
- Yield: Percentage of admitted students who enrolled
- Wait List Offers: Number of applicants offered a place on the wait list
- Wait List Acceptances: Number of wait-listed students who were eventually offered admission and accepted

== Notes ==
- Data is for the Class of 2028 (entering Fall 2024)
- Sources are official Common Data Set reports or institutional admissions data https://commondataset.org/

== See also ==
- College admissions in the United States
- Transfer admissions in the United States
