= History of the University of Virginia =

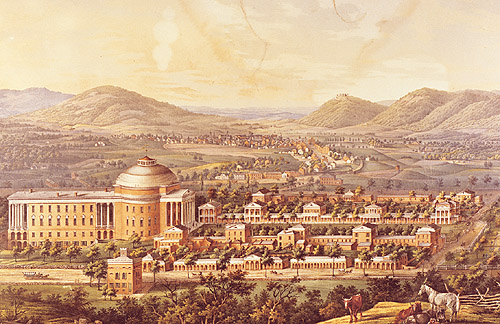
1856 lithograph of the Academical Village (Rotunda, Pavilions, and the Lawn)

The history of the University of Virginia opens with its conception by Thomas Jefferson at the beginning of the early 19th century. The university was chartered in 1819, and classes commenced in 1825.

== 19th century ==
=== Background ===
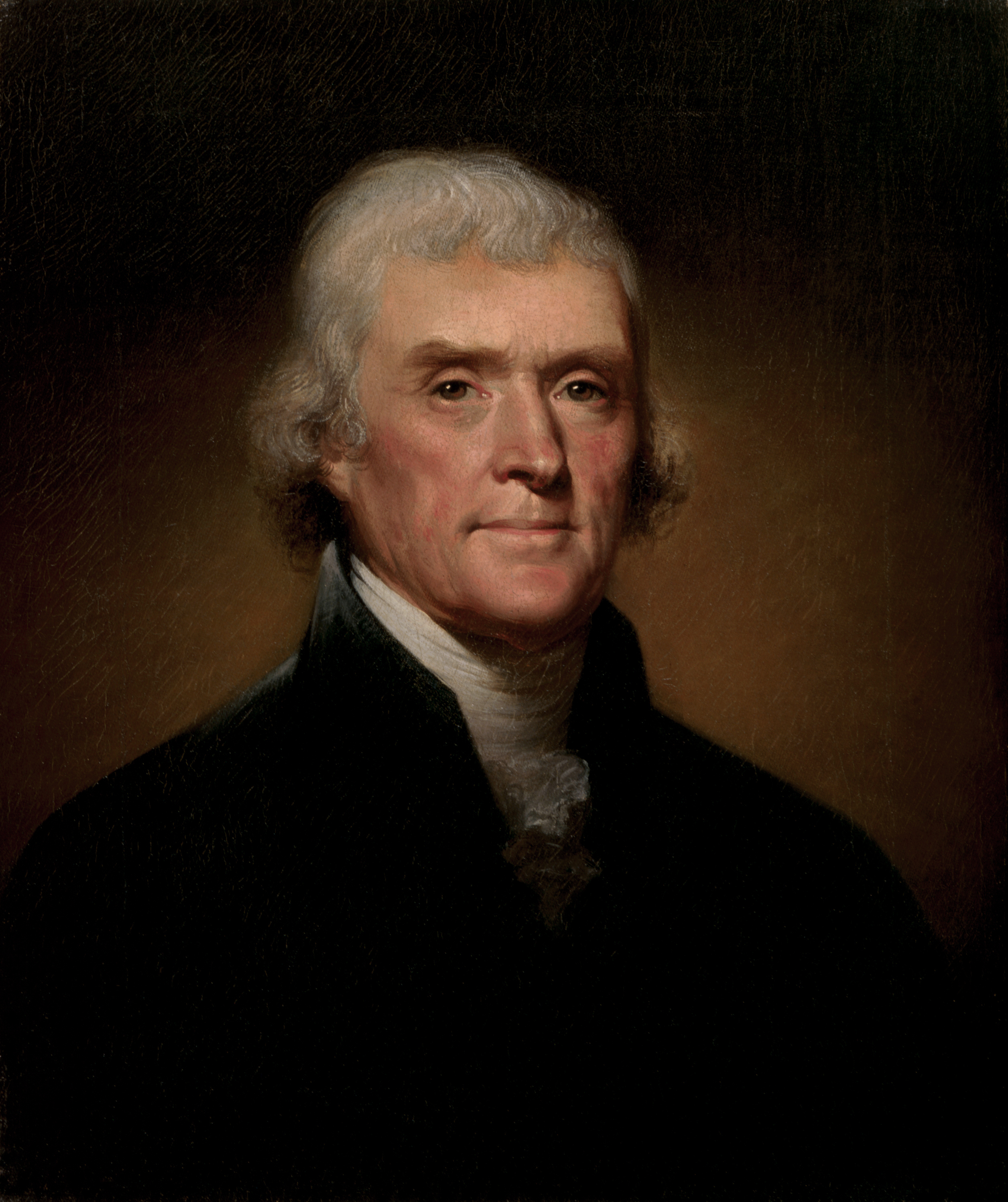
Father of the University of Virginia, Thomas Jefferson was the first and only president of the United States to found an institution of higher learning.

On January 18, 1800, Thomas Jefferson, then the Vice President of the United States, alluded to plans for a new college in a letter written to British scientist Joseph Priestley: "We wish to establish in the upper country of Virginia, and more centrally for the State, a University on a plan so broad and liberal and modern, as to be worth patronizing with the public support, and be a temptation to the youth of other States to come and drink of the cup of knowledge and fraternize with us."

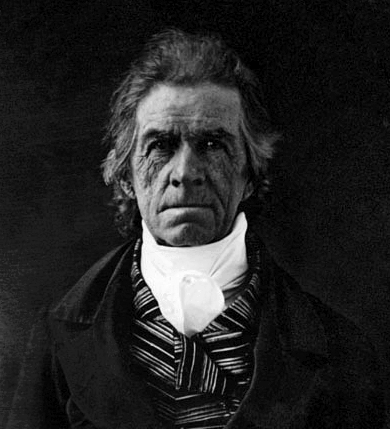
John Hartwell Cocke, 1850s

In 1802, while serving as president of the United States, Jefferson wrote to artist Charles Willson Peale that his concept of the new university would be "on the most extensive and liberal scale that our circumstances would call for and our faculties meet". Virginia was already home to The College of William & Mary, but Jefferson lost confidence in his alma mater, partly because of its religious stances and lack of courses in the sciences. Although Jefferson had flourished under the tutelage of College of William & Mary professors William Small and George Wythe, his concerns with the College became great enough by 1800 that he wrote: "We have in that State, a college just well enough endowed to draw out the miserable existence to which a miserable constitution has doomed it." Thus, he began planning a university more aligned with his educational ideals. Jefferson also pushed for the establishment of the planned university to prevent young Southern men from attending Northern colleges where they might be exposed to anti-slavery sentiment; the historian Leslie M. Harris describes the university as being founded partly as a "pro-slavery bulwark".

=== Founding ===
The University of Virginia stands on a farm that had once been owned by American Revolutionary War veteran (and eventual fifth president of the United States), James Monroe. Guided by Jefferson, the school laid its first building's cornerstone in late 1817, and the Commonwealth of Virginia chartered the new college on January 25, 1819. John Hartwell Cocke led efforts with James Madison, Monroe, and Joseph Carrington Cabell to fulfill Jefferson's dream to establish the university. Cocke and Jefferson were appointed to the building committee to supervise the construction.

In the presence of James Madison, the Marquis de Lafayette toasted Jefferson as "father" of the University of Virginia at the school's inaugural banquet in 1824. The university's first classes met on March 7, 1825. Other universities of the day allowed only three choices of specialization: medicine, law, and religion. Under Jefferson's guidance, the University of Virginia became the first in the United States to allow specializations in such diverse fields as astronomy, architecture, botany, philosophy, and political science. Jefferson explained, "This institution will be based on the illimitable freedom of the human mind. For here we are not afraid to follow truth wherever it may lead, nor to tolerate any error so long as reason is left free to combat it."

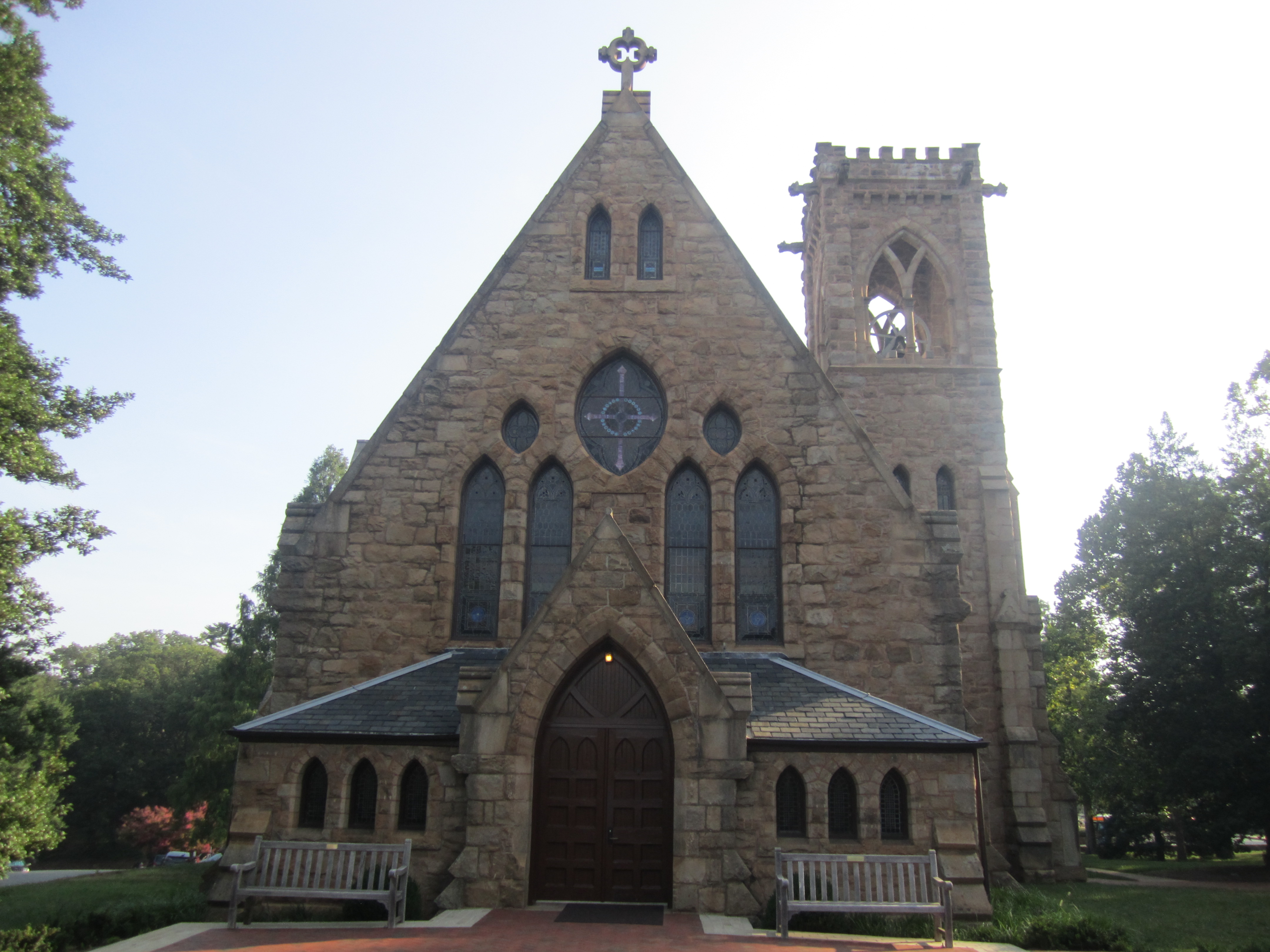
The non-denominational chapel near the Rotunda of the university was established in 1890, beyond the original scope of Jefferson's plans.

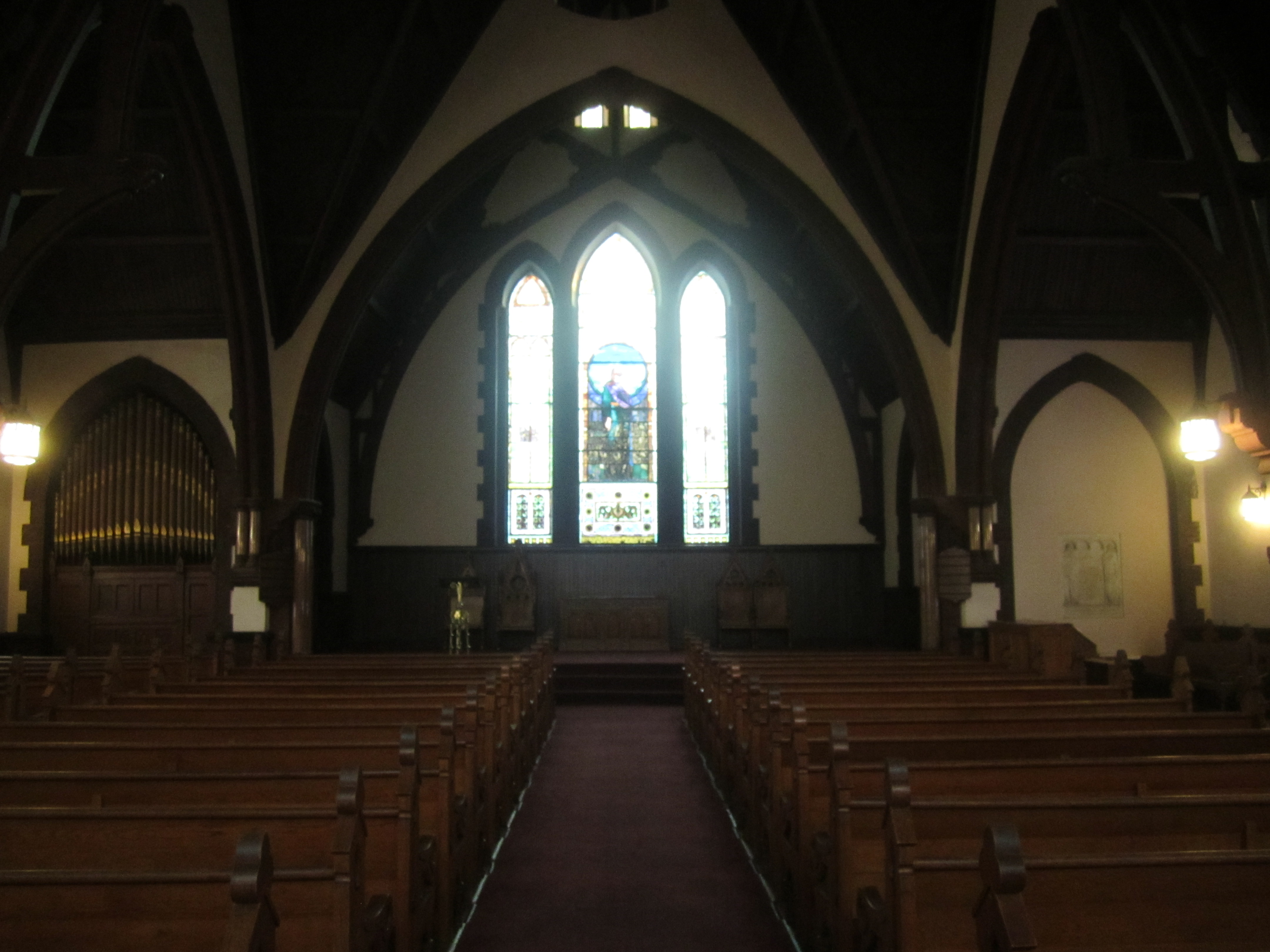
Inside the UVA Chapel

An even more controversial direction was taken for the new university based on a daring vision that higher education should be completely separated from religious doctrine. One of the largest construction projects in North America up to that time, the new Grounds were centered upon a library (then housed in the Rotunda) rather than a church – further distinguishing it from peer universities of the United States, most of which were still primarily functioning as seminaries for one particular religion or another. Jefferson even went so far as to ban the teaching of theology altogether. In a letter to Thomas Cooper in October 1814, Jefferson stated, "a professorship of theology should have no place in our institution" and, true to form, the university has never had a divinity school; it was established independent of any religious sect. Replacing the then-standard specialization in religion, the university undertook groundbreaking specializations in scientific subjects such as astronomy and botany. (However, today UVA does maintain a strong religious studies department. A non-denominational chapel, notably absent from Jefferson's original plans, was constructed in 1890.)

=== Early years ===
Jefferson was intimately involved in the university, hosting Sunday dinners at his Monticello home for faculty and students until his death. So taken with the import of what he viewed the university's foundations and potential to be, and counting it amongst his greatest accomplishments, Jefferson insisted his grave mention only his status as the author of the Declaration of Independence and Virginia Statute for Religious Freedom, and father of the University of Virginia. Thus, he eschewed mention of his presidency and national accomplishments in favor of being remembered for the newly established university. Until the 1890s students were all male, and until 1950 all were white.

In 1826, the nation's fourth president, James Madison, became rector of the University of Virginia, at the same time America's fifth president, James Monroe, made his home on the grounds (at Monroe Hill) and was a member of the board of visitors. Both former presidents stayed at the university until their deaths in the 1830s.

The same year, 1826, poet Edgar Allan Poe enrolled at the university, where he excelled in Latin. The Raven Society, an organization named after Poe's most famous poem, continues to maintain 13 West Range, the room Poe inhabited during the single semester he attended the University (he left because of financial difficulties).

The School of Engineering and Applied Science opened in 1836, making it the first engineering school in the United States to be attached to a comprehensive university.

Initially, some of the students arriving at the university matched the then-common picture of college students; wealthy, spoiled aristocrats with a sense of privilege which often led to brawling, or worse. This was a source of frustration for Jefferson, who assembled the students during the school's first year, on October 3, 1825, to criticize such behavior; but was too overcome to speak. He later spoke of this moment as "the most painful event" of his life. The irresponsible behavior of the students culminated in the murder of Professor John A. G. Davis, Chairman of the Faculty, in 1840.

According to a 96-page report published by the University in 2019, "slavery was “in every way imaginable...central to the project of designing, funding, building, and maintaining the school.” The university has erected a Memorial to Enslaved Laborers.

=== Support for the Confederacy ===
At the onset of the American Civil War the University of Virginia was the largest in the Southern United States and second nationwide only to Harvard University in number of students and faculty.

The university was a center of pro-slavery thought: "In the 1850s, many justified southern universities—and especially the University of Virginia—because they defended slavery as a core part of southern values." When Harriet Beecher Stowe's sister Catherine came to the campus in 1855, she was burned in effigy.

The university was a "hotbed of the Confederacy". Most of the students at the time supported secession, and some who opposed it believed that maintaining the Union was the best way to keep slavery intact. About 90% of the student body enrolled in Confederate military units.

In 1862, 18-year-old Confederate captain Gratz Cohen became the first known Jewish student. He was also elected president of the Jefferson Society. He was killed three years later at the Battle of Bentonville.

Unlike many other colleges in the South, the university was kept open throughout the conflict, although in 1863 and 1864 there were only about 50 students, most of them wounded Confederate soldiers. In March 1865, Union General George Armstrong Custer marched his troops into Charlottesville, bringing with them the Emancipation Proclamation and freeing all the enslaved. Faculty and community leaders convinced Custer to spare the university. Though Union troops camped on the Lawn and damaged many of the Pavilions, Custer's men left four days later without bloodshed and the university was able to return to its educational routines.

== 20th century ==
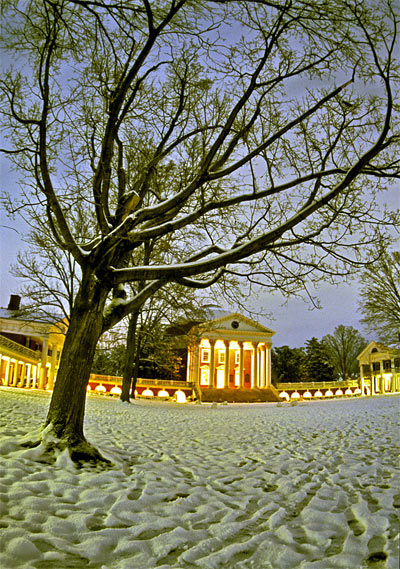
The Lawn during winter, with tracks through the snow. At center is the Rotunda, which was the original library building at the head of Jefferson's Academical Village.

=== The university's first president ===
Jefferson, ever the skeptic of central authority and bureaucracy, had originally decided that the University of Virginia would have no president. Rather, this power was to be shared by a rector and a board of visitors. As the 19th century waned, it became obvious this cumbersome arrangement was incapable of adequately handling the many administrative and fundraising tasks that had become necessary to support the growing University.

In 1904, Edwin Alderman resigned as president of Tulane University to take the same position at the University of Virginia. As the university's first president, he embarked on a number of reforms for both the university and the state of Virginia's public educational systems in general. A reform specific to the University of Virginia was one of the first school-sponsored financial aid programs in all of higher learning and, though primitive by today's standards, it included a loan provision for needy men who were unable to pay. Initially controversial and opposed by many at what had become a very traditional school, Alderman's progressive ideas stood the test of time. He remains the longest-tenured president in the university's history, having served for twenty-six years until his death in 1931. Alderman Library was named in his honor, though it was later renamed to Shannon Library due to Alderman's associations with eugenics.

=== World War II ===
During World War II, Virginia was one of 131 colleges and universities nationally that took part in the V-12 Navy College Training Program which offered students a path to a Navy commission.

=== William Faulkner ===
Pulitzer and Nobel Prize winner William Faulkner became a writer-in-residence at the university in 1957, keeping open office hours until his death in 1962. He was named a professor of English and had the title of "Consultant on American Literature to the Alderman Library". Faulkner donated a large collection of his manuscripts, typescripts, and correspondence to the William Faulkner Foundation, which he created, and the foundation in turn donated the manuscripts to the library upon his death. These and many further Faulkner-related materials reside in the Albert and Shirley Small Special Collections Library today.

=== Desegregation and the admission of women ===
The University of Virginia began the process of integration even before the 1954 Brown v. Board of Education decision mandated school desegregation for all grade levels, when Gregory Swanson sued to gain entrance into the university's law school in 1950. Following his successful lawsuit, a handful of Black graduate and professional students were admitted during the 1950s, though no Black undergraduates were admitted until 1955, and UVA, like other Southern schools, continued to resist full integration until well into the 1960s. The university was "later than even most southern universities" in admitting Black students.

The university first admitted a few selected women to graduate studies in the late 1890s and to certain programs such as nursing and education in the 1920s and 1930s. In 1944, Mary Washington College in Fredericksburg, Virginia, became the Women's Undergraduate Arts and Sciences Division of the University of Virginia. Until that time, the University of Virginia had not admitted women as undergraduates. In 1969, Virginia Scott, who lived in Charlottesville, sued the university in federal court for College of Arts and Sciences admission. John Lowe, who employed Scott and who had graduated from UVA's law school in 1967, took the case. Mary Whitney resigned from being Dean of Women to testify in support of female students. The trial was put on hold with a continuance, and during this the university's Board of Visitors accepted coeducation. In 1970, the Charlottesville campus became fully co-educational, and in 1972 Mary Washington became an independent state university. In 1970, the first class of 450 undergraduate women entered UVA (39 percent), while the number of men admitted remained constant. By 2003 women comprised 55 percent of the undergraduate student body.

=== Creation of the first and only branch campus ===
The University of Virginia established its first and only branch campus, at Wise, Virginia, in 1954. The UVA Wise campus currently enrolls 2,000 students. As a public, four-year residential college located in the mountains of southwestern Virginia, The University of Virginia's College at Wise is recognized as one of the top public liberal arts colleges in the nation.

UVa–Wise is home to Virginia's only undergraduate degree program in software engineering. UVa–Wise offers 30 majors, 32 minors, seven pre-professional programs, and 24 teaching licensures.

For several consecutive years, students at UVa–Wise have graduated with the lowest debt load of any public liberal arts college in the nation, according to U.S. News & World Report.

== 21st century ==
=== Decline in state support ===
In 2004, as the result of a stark decrease in state support, the University of Virginia became the first public university in the United States to receive more funding from private sources than from the state with which it is associated. Thanks to a charter initiative that passed the Virginia General Assembly and was signed into law by then-Governor Mark Warner in 2005, the university — and any other public universities in the state that choose to do so (currently Virginia Tech and William & Mary) – will have greater autonomy over its own affairs. The university was subject to an audit by the state, which found that while the school met most of the goals established by the deal, the number of minority students enrolled in the university declined.

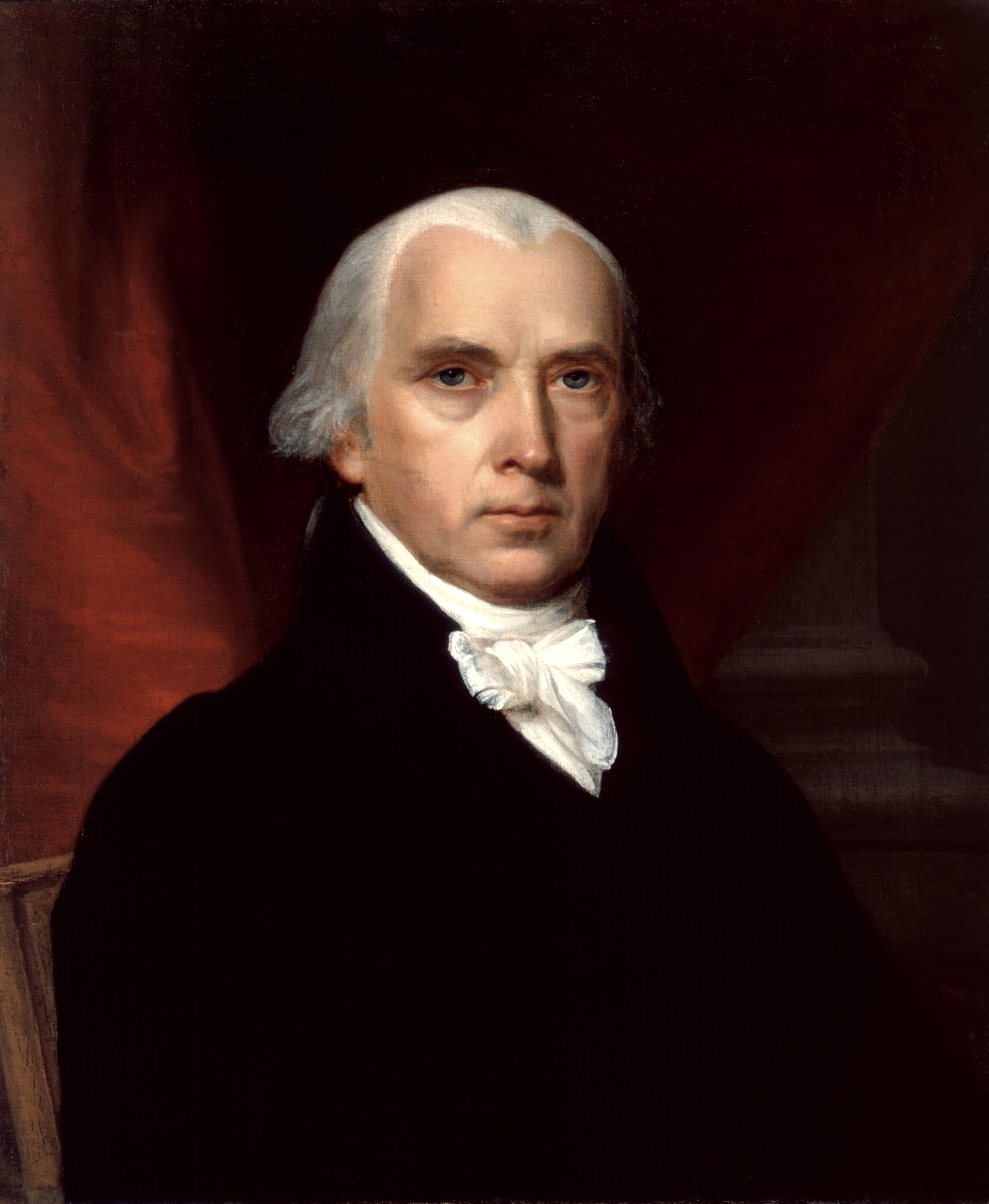
President James Madison served as the second rector of the University of Virginia until his death in 1836.

Also in 2004, at the 100th anniversary of Alderman becoming president, UVA under President John T. Casteen III announced the AccessUVa financial aid program. This program guarantees the university will meet 100% of a U.S. student's demonstrated need. It also provides low-income students (up to 200% of the poverty line – as of 2009, about $44,000 for a family of four) with full grants to cover all of their educational needs, and it caps the level of need-based loans for all other students. This program was the first to guarantee full grants to students of low-income families at any public university in the United States.

Today, minority students are particularly successful at the University of Virginia. According to the Fall 2005 issue of Journal of Blacks in Higher Education, UVA "has the highest black student graduation rate of the Public Ivies at 86 percent". The journal also states that "by far the most impressive is the University of Virginia with its high Black student graduation rate and its small racial difference in graduation rates".

The University of Virginia, together with Harvard University and Princeton University, ended its Early Decision and Early Action programs in September 2006, stating that such policies limit poor and middle-class students from competing on an equal footing with wealthier applicants. For its part, UVA noted that of 947 Early Decision acceptances for the Class of 2010, fewer than 20 of those students had applied for financial aid. Non-binding early action was instated for the first time for the class of 2016 as "early action did not have the same impact on students of lower socioeconomic means because it is not binding".

=== Removal and reinstatement of President Sullivan ===
In 2010, the university welcomed Teresa A. Sullivan as the university's first female president. Two years later, during the spring of 2012, the first female rector, Helen Dragas, decided to remove President Sullivan. Instead of convening the board of visitors to discuss firing the president, Dragas secretly lobbied board members in one-on-one phone calls, and then surprised Sullivan in her office on June 8, 2012, with a demand for her resignation. Rector Dragas convened a three-member executive committee meeting to accept the forced resignation, and then required Sullivan's subordinates to report directly to the Rrctor's office, effectively removing Sullivan from any remaining management role.

President Sullivan, in a subsequent New York Times interview, said she did not know why she was removed. Professor Larry Sabato, in the UVA Alumni Magazine, called it "a midnight knifing", a "palace coup" to be reversed by "a grassroots rebellion".

The resignation elicited strong protests, including a faculty Senate vote of no confidence in the board of visitors and Rector Dragas, and demands from the student government for an explanation for Sullivan's ouster. In the face of mounting pressure, including alumni threats to cease contributions, and a mandate from Virginia Governor Robert McDonnell to resolve the issue or he would remove the entire board, the board unanimously voted to reinstate Sullivan as president.

In December 2012, the Southern Association of Colleges and Schools put UVA "on warning" that it risked losing its accreditation because President Sullivan's removal violated their standards for board governance and faculty role in decisionmaking. After the board of visitors changed its operating procedures so a minority of members could no longer control the board, the threat to UVa's accreditation was lifted.

=== 2022 shooting ===
On November 13, 2022, three people were killed and two were wounded when former UVA football player Christopher Darnell Jones Jr. opened fire in Culbreth Garage around 10:00 pm. A large-scale manhunt was initiated by local and state law enforcement.

== Visitors and gatherings at the university ==
On June 10, 1940, President Franklin D. Roosevelt came to the university's Memorial Gymnasium to watch his son Franklin D. Roosevelt Jr. graduate, and to give the commencement address. Instead, "in this university founded by the first great American teacher of democracy", he made his impromptu "Stab in the Back" speech, denouncing the act of Italy joining beside Nazi Germany to invade Italy and France on that day. (Graduation ceremonies are traditionally held on the Lawn, but rain had forced a move to "Mem Gym" for the Class of 1940.)

In the early 1960s, civil rights leaders Martin Luther King Jr., James Farmer, Aaron Henry, Bayard Rustin, and others spoke at the university under the sponsorship of the Virginia Council on Human Relations, a student organization which presented speakers on the Grounds who opposed the state's prevailing policy of racial segregation. John Lewis, Chairman of the Student Nonviolent Coordinating Committee spoke in 1965 while his head was still bandaged from a police beating he received leading the first march from Selma to Montgomery.

Martin Luther King Jr.'s speech at Old Cabell Hall in 1963 met with no resistance of any kind among the student body or administration. He called for a doubling of Black registrations at universities in the South. African-American enrollment has since been increased tenfold at the university. Five years later in 1968, when King was shot, the Rotunda flag was flown at half-mast, and then-president of the university Edgar F. Shannon Jr., led a UVa memorial service in Cabell Hall. All classes at UVa were made optional during the service.

To commemorate the United States Bicentennial in 1976, Britain's Queen Elizabeth II strolled the Lawn and lunched in the Dome Room of the Rotunda, one of five American sites she publicly visited.

The Dalai Lama, Archbishop Desmond Tutu, and several other Nobel Peace laureates stayed on the Grounds for one week in 1998 while attending the university's historic Nobel Laureates Conference.

On September 27 and 28, 1988, President George H. W. Bush convened the Charlottesville Education Summit. The discussions on furthering national education goals were led by then Arkansas Governor Bill Clinton, who would later be elected president in 1992 on a platform that promised economic and education reforms. The conference led to several reform proposals for the higher education system, which became the basis for Goals 2000 legislation, introduced into Congress in 1994 and signed into law by President Clinton on March 31, 1994.

On August 25, 2012, the university refused an offer by President Barack Obama to hold a campaign speech on the Grounds. The reason cited was that the day of the event was also the second day of classes for the 2012–13 school year, and this would be too disruptive to the students and their class schedules. Obama ended up speaking at the Downtown Mall Amphitheater located in downtown Charlottesville, well away from the university. This refusal caused a bit of controversy; some felt that the university was being disrespectful to the president, while others felt that the action was appropriate, and in the best interest of the students.

== See also ==
- Memorial to Enslaved Laborers
