= ED2 =

ED2 may refer to:

- Early decision II, a form of early college admissions in the United States
- Evil Dead II, a 1987 film
- Suzuki Katana ED2, a motorcycle
- Toyota ED2, a European automotive design facility
