= Isabella Gibbons =

American teacher

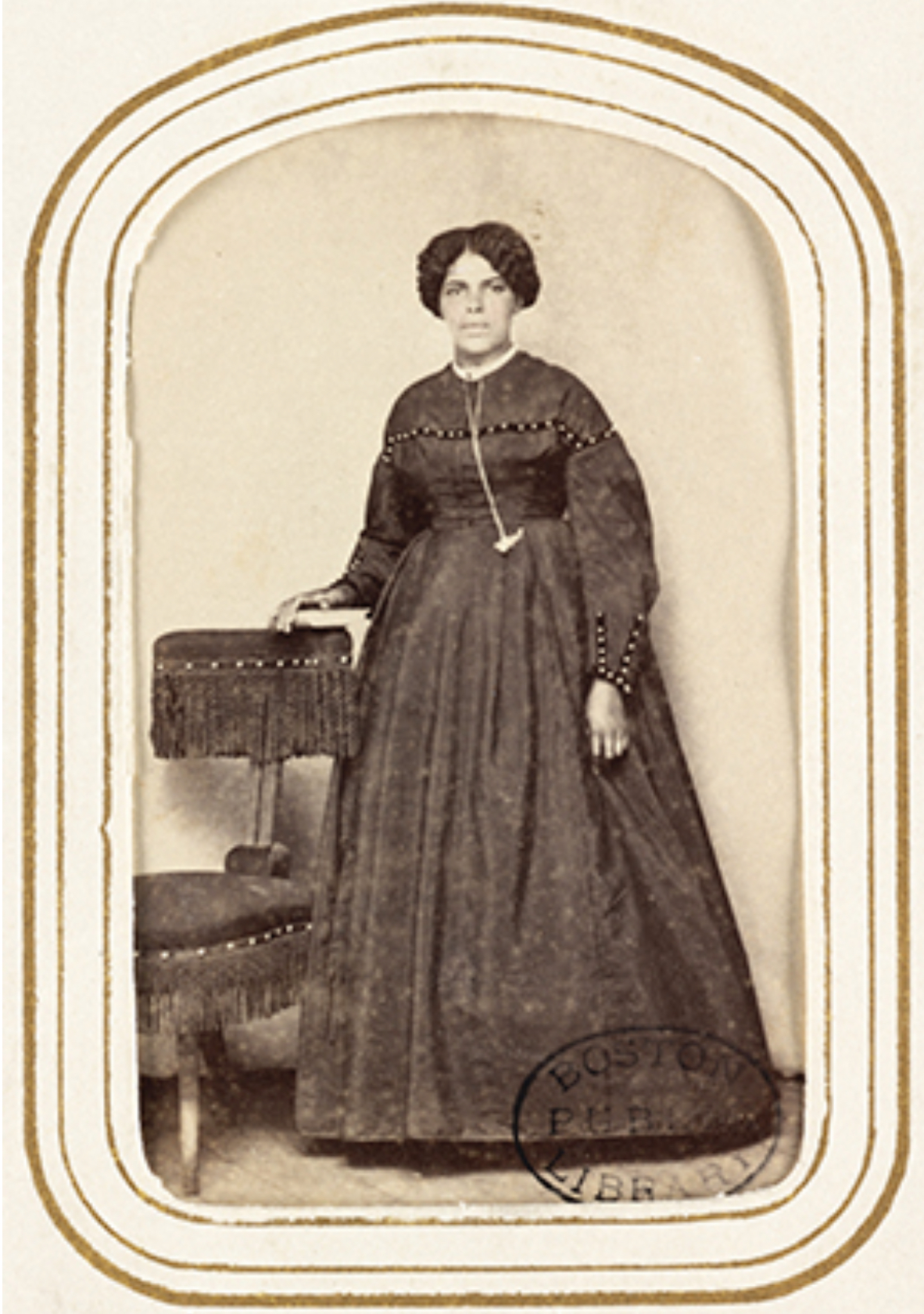
- Born: c. 1836; Virginia
- Died: February 4, 1890 (about 54 years old); Washington, D.C.
- Burial place: Charlottesville, Virginia
- Other name: Isabella Gibbins
- Occupations: Acted as Nurse during civil war, Teacher
- Years active: 1866–1874
- Known for: Her eyes on the Memorial to Enslaved Laborers
- Spouse: William Gibbons

Isabella Gibbons (c. 1836 – February 4, 1890) was an enslaved woman serving as a cook at the University of Virginia, in Charlottesville, Virginia. After she was freed in 1865 she became a teacher.

== Under slavery ==
Isabella's birth date, place of birth, and parents are unknown. About 1850 she was purchased by William Barton Rogers, a professor of natural philosophy (science) at the University who later founded the Massachusetts Institute of Technology, and was his family's cook until 1853. She apparently was taught to read by Emma Savage Rogers. In the early 1850s she married William Gibbons, also an enslaved laborer owned by a university professor. They had four children; one was named Bella.

In 1853 Rogers was replaced as professor of natural philosophy by Francis Henry Smith, and Gibbons was the cook for Smith's family until 1863.

She acted as nurse at the Confederate military hospital set up at the university.

== After emancipation ==
She and her husband were freed when General Philip Sheridan's troops reached Charlottesville, bringing the Emancipation Proclamation with them, on March 3, 1865 (see Liberation and Freedom Day).

She became a teacher at the Freedmen's School; its direct descendant is the Jefferson School. Newspaper reports speak positively of her:

We have four teachers at Charlottesville, and Miss Anna Gardner has taken the more advanced pupils whom she is forming into a normal [teacher training] class. One of her pupils has also aided her in teaching, Mrs. Isabella Gibbins. Although the mother of several children, whom she must aid in supporting, she wishes to perfect her own education and become a teacher of her people. She is doubly precious to our hearts, as the devoted nurse of one of the noblest and best-beloved of our young officers, who died a prisoner in rebel hands.

She received similar praise in 1867 and 1869. The last reference to her as a Charlottesville teacher is from 1874.

== Memorial to Enslaved Laborers ==
The only known writing of Isabella is the following letter, published in the journal of the charity providing support to schools for freedmen, the New England Freedman's Aid Society. In all the several references to her in this publication her name appears as Gibbins.

CHARLOTTESVILLE, Va., March 29, 1867.

DEAR LADY,—We have lived to see the fortieth Congress and to behold a change of affairs. The rebels begin to see the error of their way at last, and do all they can to better our race. They say the colored people are not only free but have a right to vote. Now let us be kind to them; they have been our slaves, and we must do something for them. It will not do to leave them to the care of those hated yankees. They will build them up as a tower against us. We must not do as we would like, but as we must, in this time of trouble, because the time that the Garrisons, the Sumners, and Stevens have been telling them about, has come, they will believe it if we do not take right steps in time. They are a good people, and so fond of their old masters, they will do what we want they should. Most of them love us, and have forgotten what happened while they were slaves. They know we are their friends.

This is a grand story for them to tell, but let us answer them. Can we forget the crack of the whip, cowhide, whipping-post, the auction-block, the hand-cuffs, the [manacles], the iron collar, the negro-trader tearing the young child from its mother’s breast as a whelp from the lioness? Have we forgotten that by those horrible cruelties, hundreds of our race have been killed? No, we have not, nor ever will.

If the Northern people who have given their life’s blood for our liberty are not our friends, where can we find them? O, God help us to love these people.

I am with the warmest regards,

Your servant,

ISABELLA GIBBINS

The sentences with italic added were inscribed in the Memorial to Enslaved Laborers at the University of Virginia, in Charlottesville.

Her eyes, from the above photograph, were etched on the outside of the memorial.

== Legacy ==
- In 2015, the University of Virginia named its new residence hall Gibbons House, in honor of Isabella and William. In the public area are photos of them, interpretive panels on the walls, and a plaque about them.
- Isabella's eyes, based on the above photograph, as there is no other, and the quote cited above, are inscribed on the exterior of the Memorial to Enslaved Laborers.
- MIT students replaced a portrait of Emma Rogers (wife of MIT founder and Isabella's enslaver William Barton Rogers) with a memorial to Isabella and Palestinian child activist Yaqeen Hammad. The display quoted Isabella's sole surviving letter to argue "Abolition means a Free Palestine, from every river to every sea."
