= The Early Admissions Game =

Book by Richard Zeckhauser

The Early Admissions Game: Joining the Elite
- Author: Christopher Avery; Andrew Fairbanks; Richard Zeckhauser
- Language: English
- Genre: Education
- Publisher: Harvard University Press
- Publication date: 2004
- Publication place: United States
- ISBN: 0-674-01620-3
- OCLC: 57251798
- Dewey Decimal: 378.1/610973 22
- LC Class: LB2351.2 .A84 2004

The Early Admissions Game: Joining the Elite is a 2004 book which concerns early admission (a form of college admissions in the United States). The authors combine survey research with an empirical analysis of more than 500,000 applications to a number of colleges. They conclude that taking advantage of early applications significantly improves one's chances of admission.

== See also ==
- College admissions in the United States
- Transfer admissions in the United States
