= Memorial to Enslaved Laborers =

Memorial in Charlottesville, Virginia

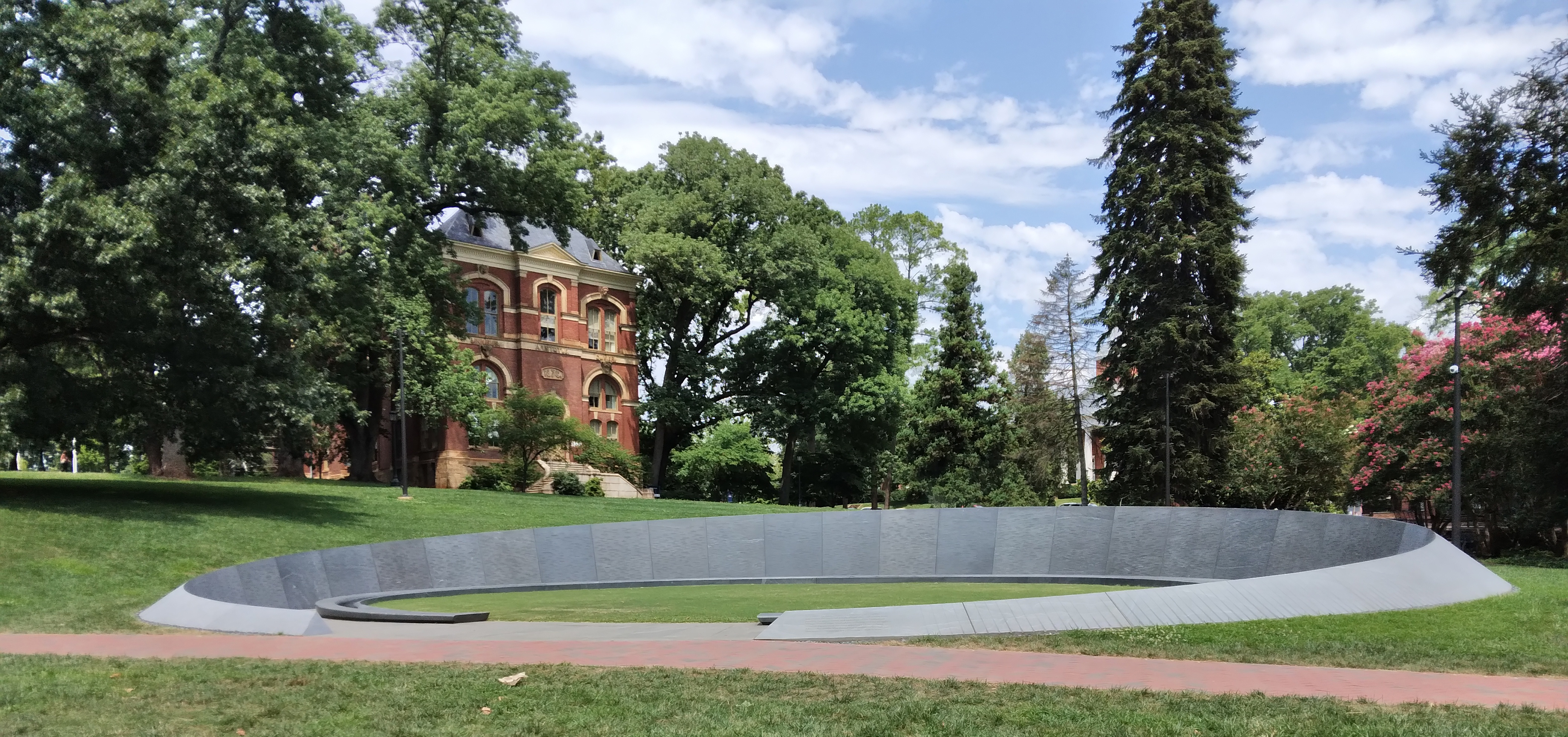
- Interactive map of Memorial to Enslaved Laborers
- 38°2′7.1″N 78°30′5.4″W
- Location: University of Virginia, Charlottesville, Virginia

History
- Established: 2020

The Memorial to Enslaved Laborers is a memorial in honor of those enslaved African Americans who helped build and worked at the University of Virginia, in Charlottesville, Virginia.

== Description ==
The memorial is located on the university's main campus, near the University of Virginia Corner, east of Brooks Hall and the Rotunda. It consists of a wall of local "Virginia Mist" granite, in the shape of a broken ring, to symbolize broken shackles. The ring is about 80 feet (24 m) in diameter, echoing the dimensions of Jefferson’s iconic Rotunda. Inside it is a second concentric ring with a timeline of slavery at the university.

Although the outer ring is large enough for the names of the 4,000 enslaved people that worked on University grounds, only 578 of their full names are known. Another 311 are known by their first name only, their job, or their relation to others who lived and/or worked there. A single engraved word remembers each—Jerry, butler, Agnes, grandmother, midwife, domestic, Billy. Most of the ring is blank, with only notches, representing the other 3,000+ for whom even this basic information is lacking. If more names are discovered they will be added.

The exterior of the outer wall also includes an engraved subtle set of eyes, the work of Eto Otitigbe. They are derived from an image of Isabella Gibbons, an enslaved woman who was owned by professors at the university before emancipation and who went on to become an educator of freed African Americans.

The following words of Gibbons are engraved on the memorial:

Can we forget the crack of the whip, the cowhide, whipping-post, the hand-cuffs, auction-block, the spaniels [manacles], the iron collar, the negro-trader tearing the young child from its mother’s breast as a whelp from the lioness? Have we forgotten that by those horrible cruelties, hundreds of our race have been killed? No, we have not, nor ever will.

"The Memorial is oriented tangent to two paths. The first path leads from the Memorial in the direction of the North Star, which for the enslaved led to freedom. The second path aligns with the sunset on March 3rd, which commemorates the day that Union troops emancipated the local enslaved community at the close of the Civil War. The communities of Charlottesville and the University will observe this important event through the newly instituted Liberation and Freedom Day March through the city. Also sharing the same north/west orientation is the Memorial’s grove of gingko trees that harkens back to the area’s previous use as a productive landscape of fruits and vegetables tended to by enslaved laborers."

== History of the memorial ==
=== Design ===
"This was actually a student-led effort from the beginning,” said University of Virginia landscape architect Mary Hughes said. “I guess that effort began in 2007 when the university's board of visitors made a public apology for the institution of slavery.” Another source says that the memorial began with student-led initiatives as early as 2010. There was then an "ideas" competition, and the final design resolution. The President’s Commission on Slavery and the University (PCSU) provided guidance. The Memorial was designed as part of a collaboration between Höweler+Yoon Architecture, Studio&, Gregg Bleam, a local landscape architect, Frank Dukes, and Eto Otitigbe. The university's board of visitors approved the design in 2019.

=== Construction and financing ===
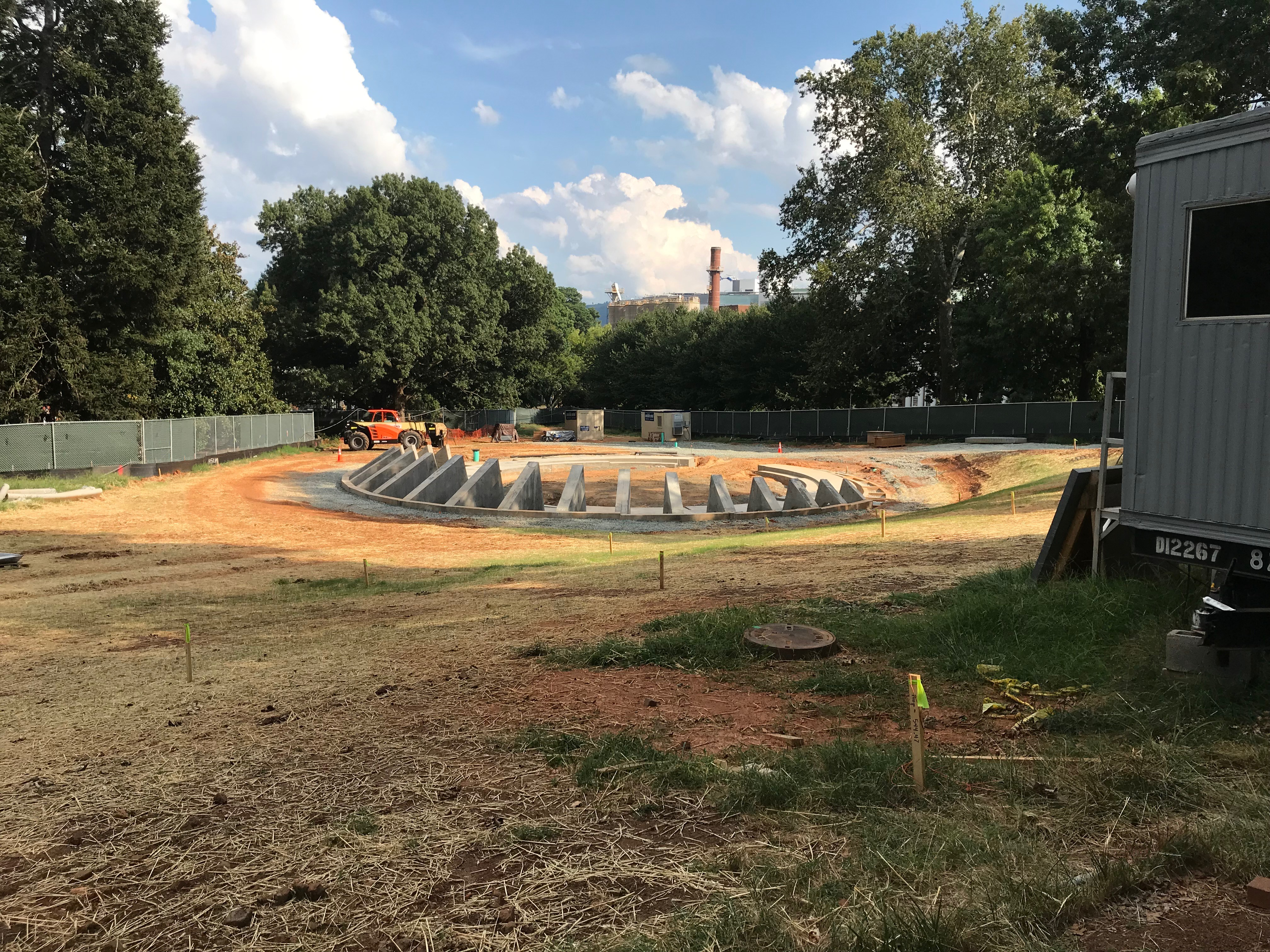
The memorial under construction in September 2019

A different source says that the Board of Visitors approved the design and site in June 2017. Construction began in January 2019, with concrete pouring beginning in early March. The memorial was scheduled for completion in October 2019; the granite slabs were placed in October.

It was to have been formally dedicated on April 11, 2020, but the university shut down shortly before that because of the coronavirus pandemic. It was paid for by $2.5 million in donations, matched by the university. Another source says the cost, estimated at that time at $6 million, was completely covered by private donations.

== Gallery ==
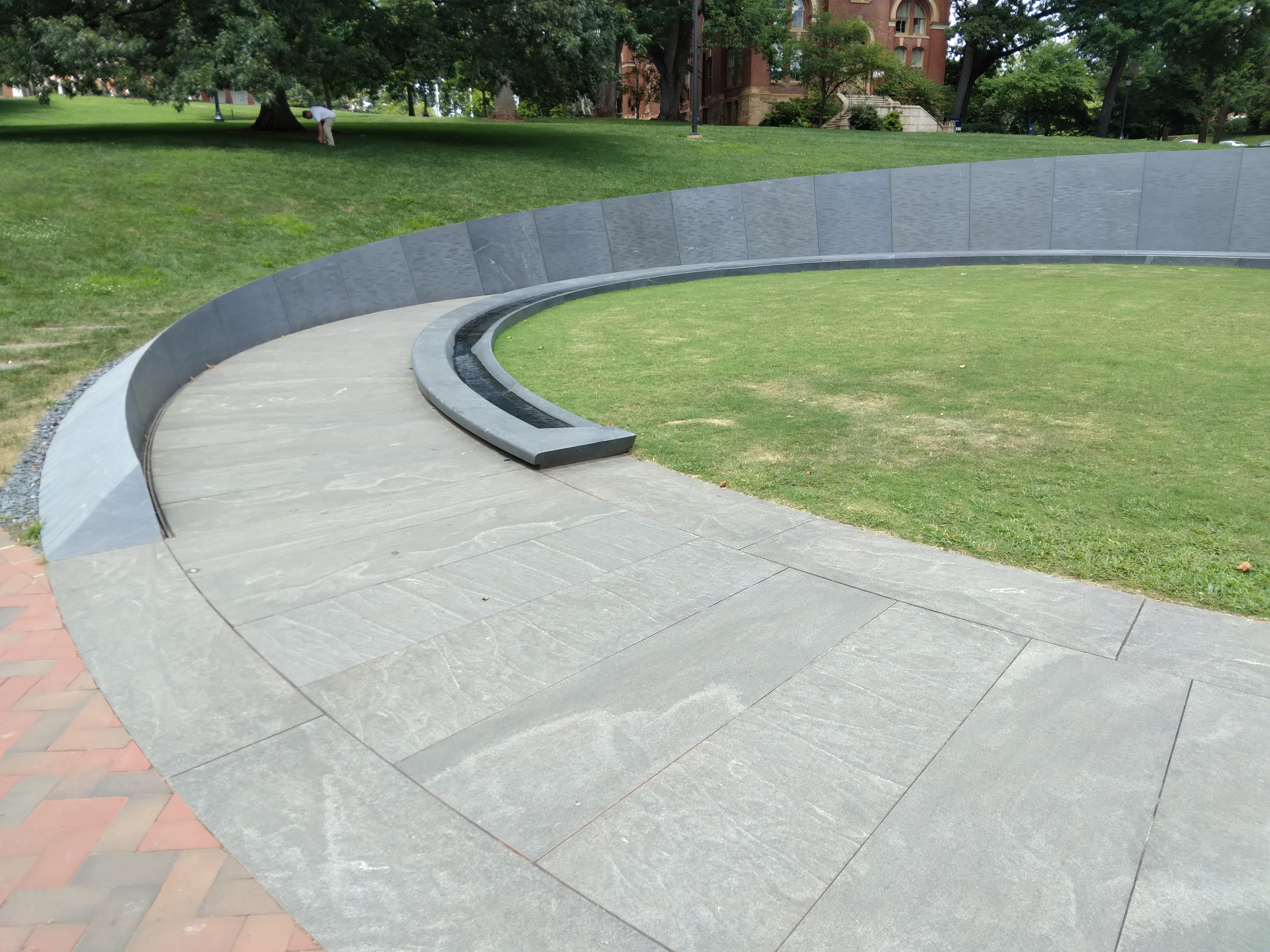

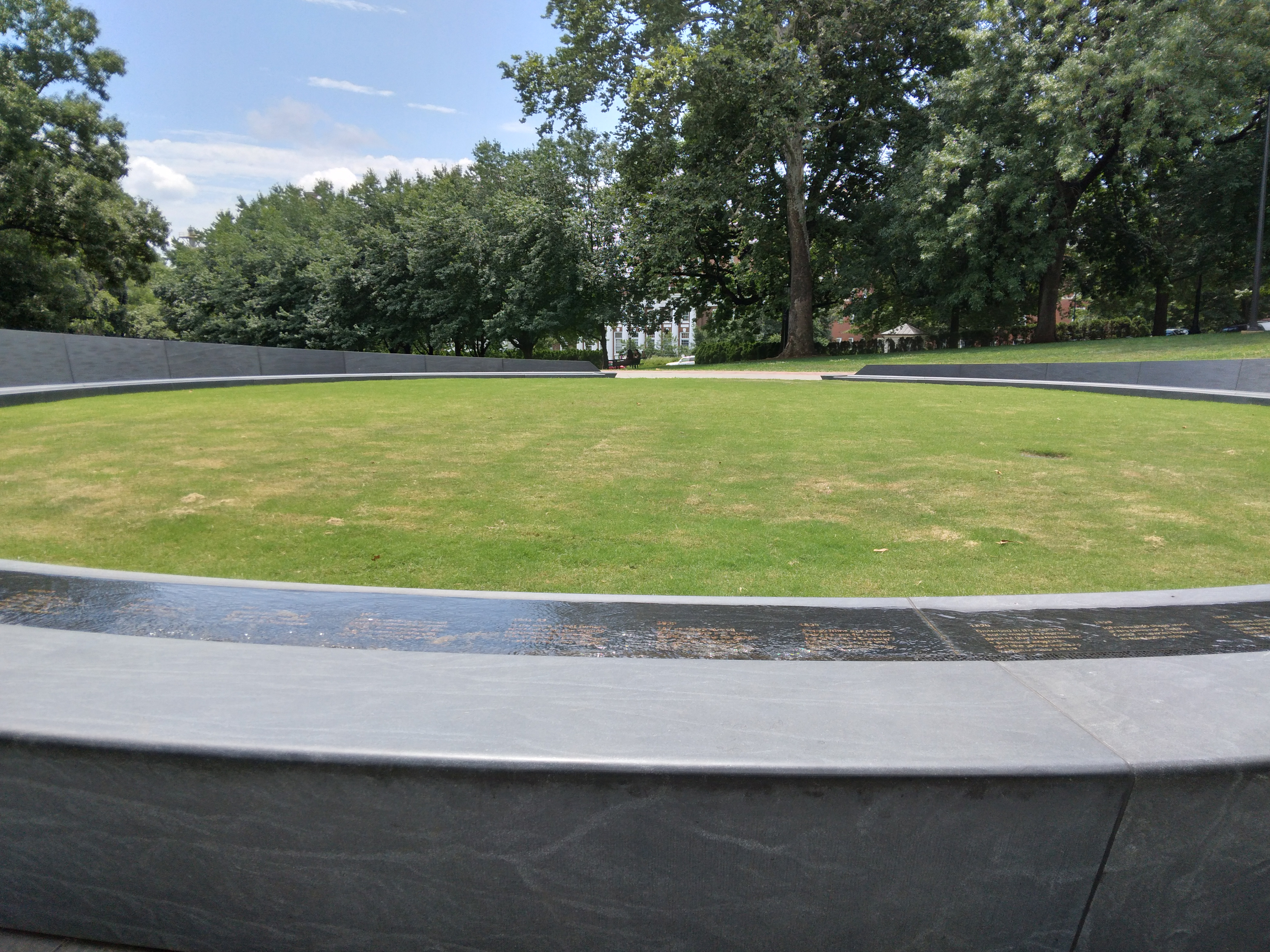

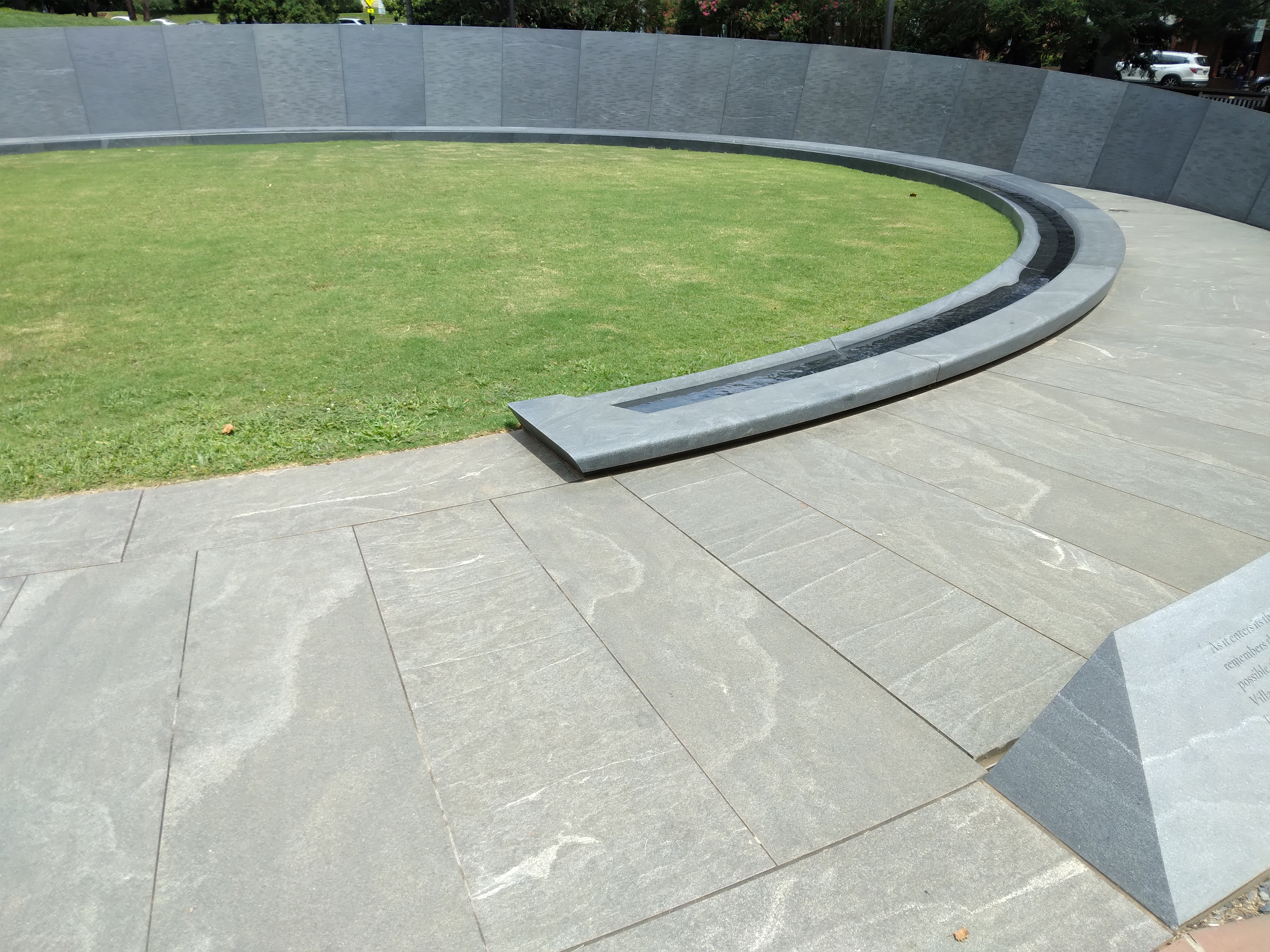

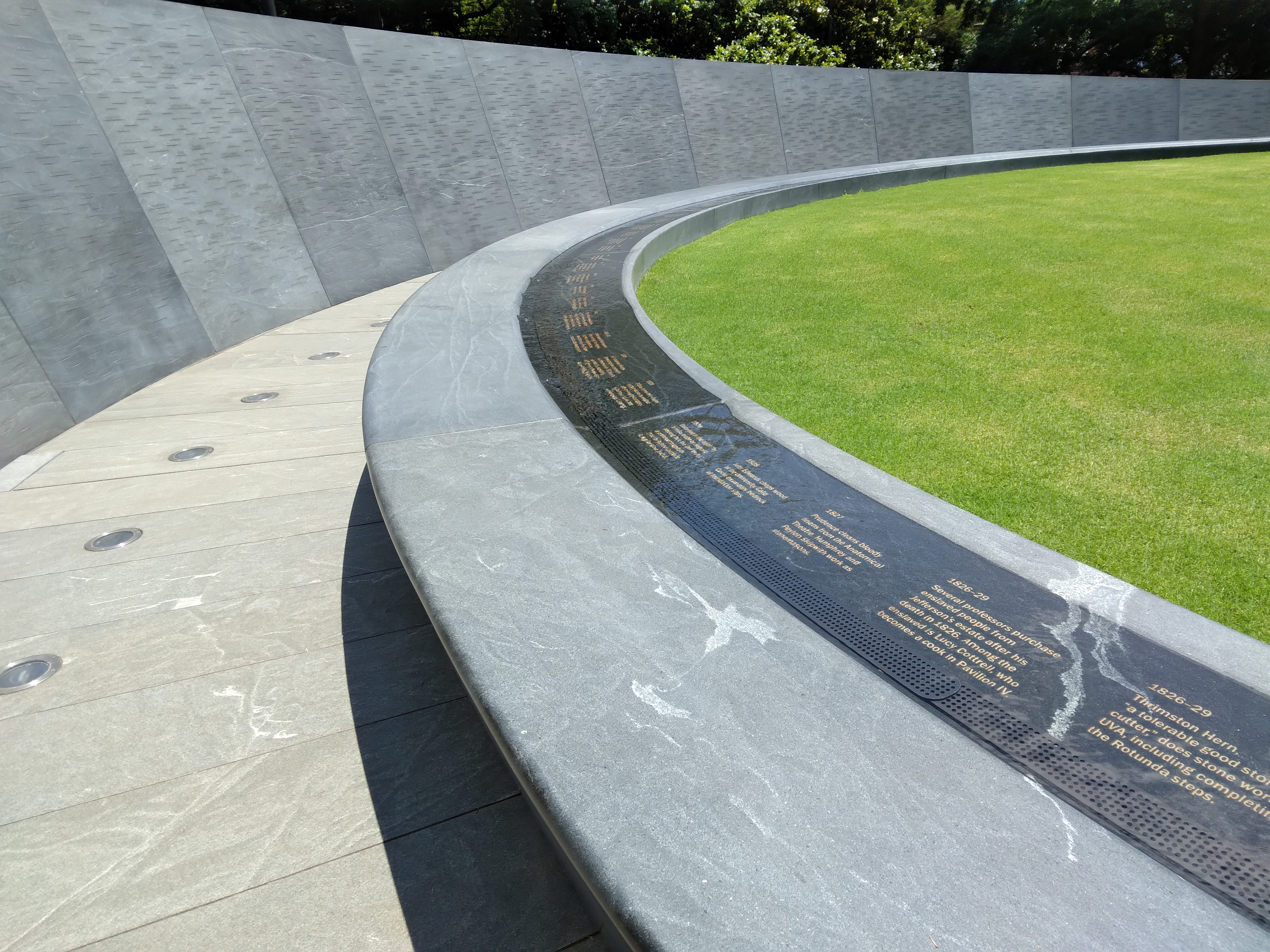

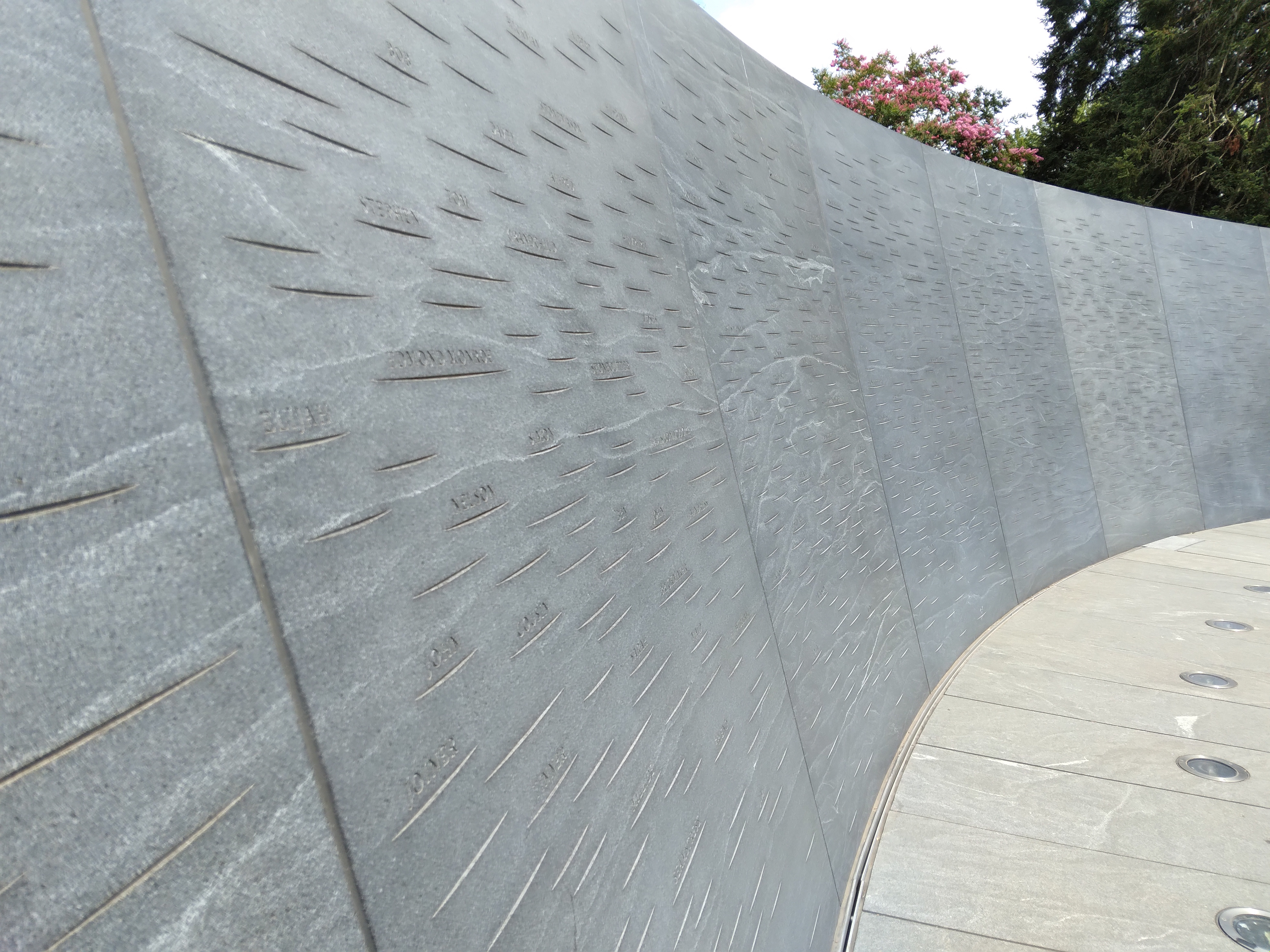

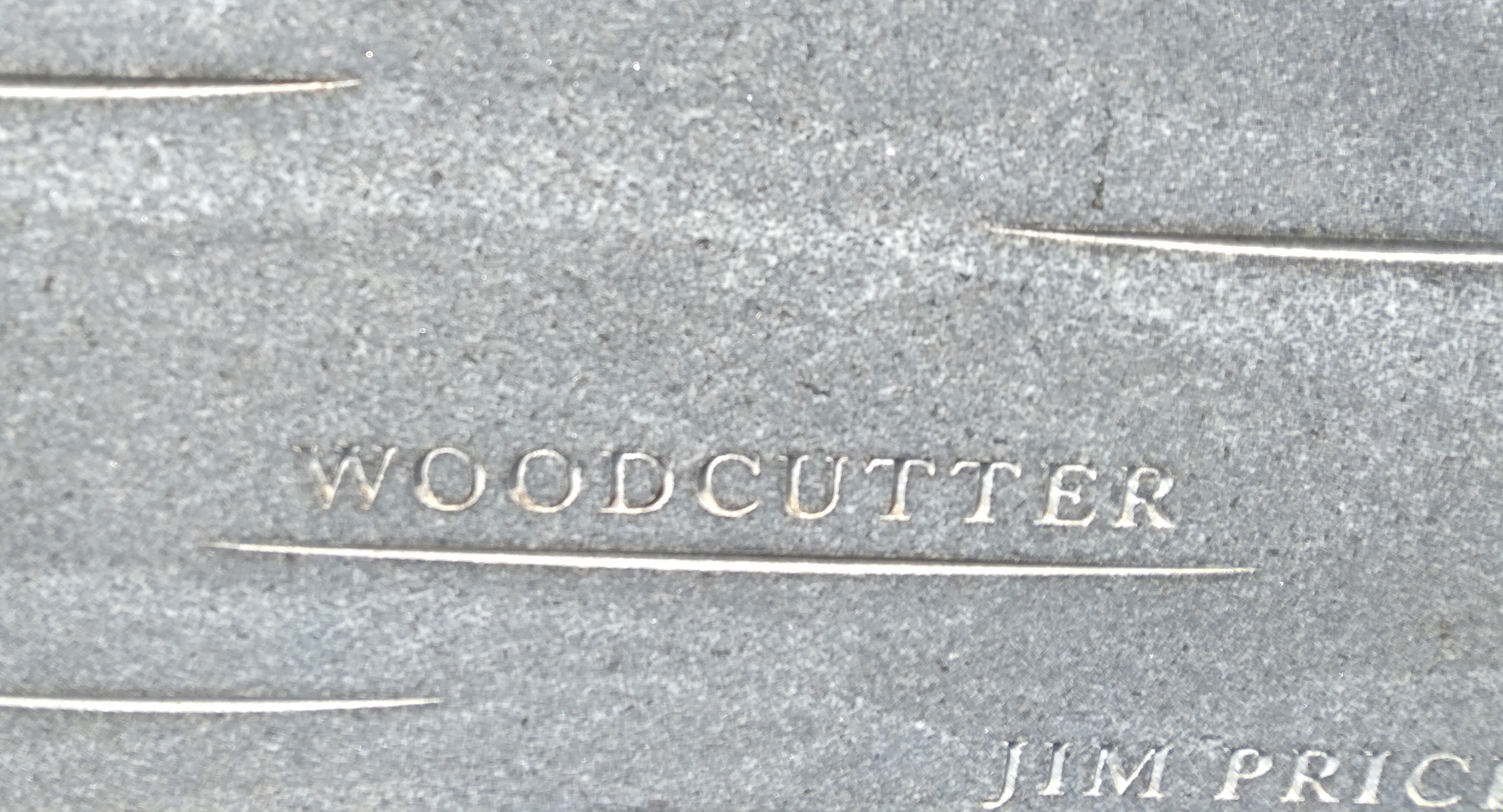

== See also ==
- Charlottesville historic monument controversy
- History of the University of Virginia
- Isabella Gibbons
- Liberation and Freedom Day
