= Liberation and Freedom Day =

Annual holiday in Charlottesville, Virginia

Liberation and Freedom Day is a city holiday in Charlottesville, Virginia celebrated on March 3. The Charlottesville City Council enacted the city measure in 2019. By a 4–1 vote, the city council also decided that the April 13 birthday of Thomas Jefferson, founder of the University of Virginia, would no longer be an official holiday in the city of Charlottesville.

The Union Army troops, under the command of Major General Philip Sheridan, arrived in Charlottesville on March 3, 1865, liberating over 14,000 enslaved workers.

On March 3, 2019, the slaves who built the university were honored in a ceremony held in the University Rotunda. The university built a Memorial to Enslaved Laborers, honoring the contributions of slaves who helped build and maintain the school. Joining in the March 3, 2019 commemoration were the Albemarle County Office of Equity and Inclusion, Carter G. Woodson Institute for African-American and African Studies at the University of Virginia, Charlottesville City Council, Jefferson School African American Heritage Center, Memorial to Enslaved Laborers Community Engagement Committee, National Association for the Advancement of Colored People at the University of Virginia, Thomas Jefferson Foundation at Monticello, United Ministries of the University of Virginia, Alumni Board of Trustees of the University of Virginia, Virginia Humanities
