= William D. Gibbons =

American minister (1825–1886)

Rev. William Gibbons
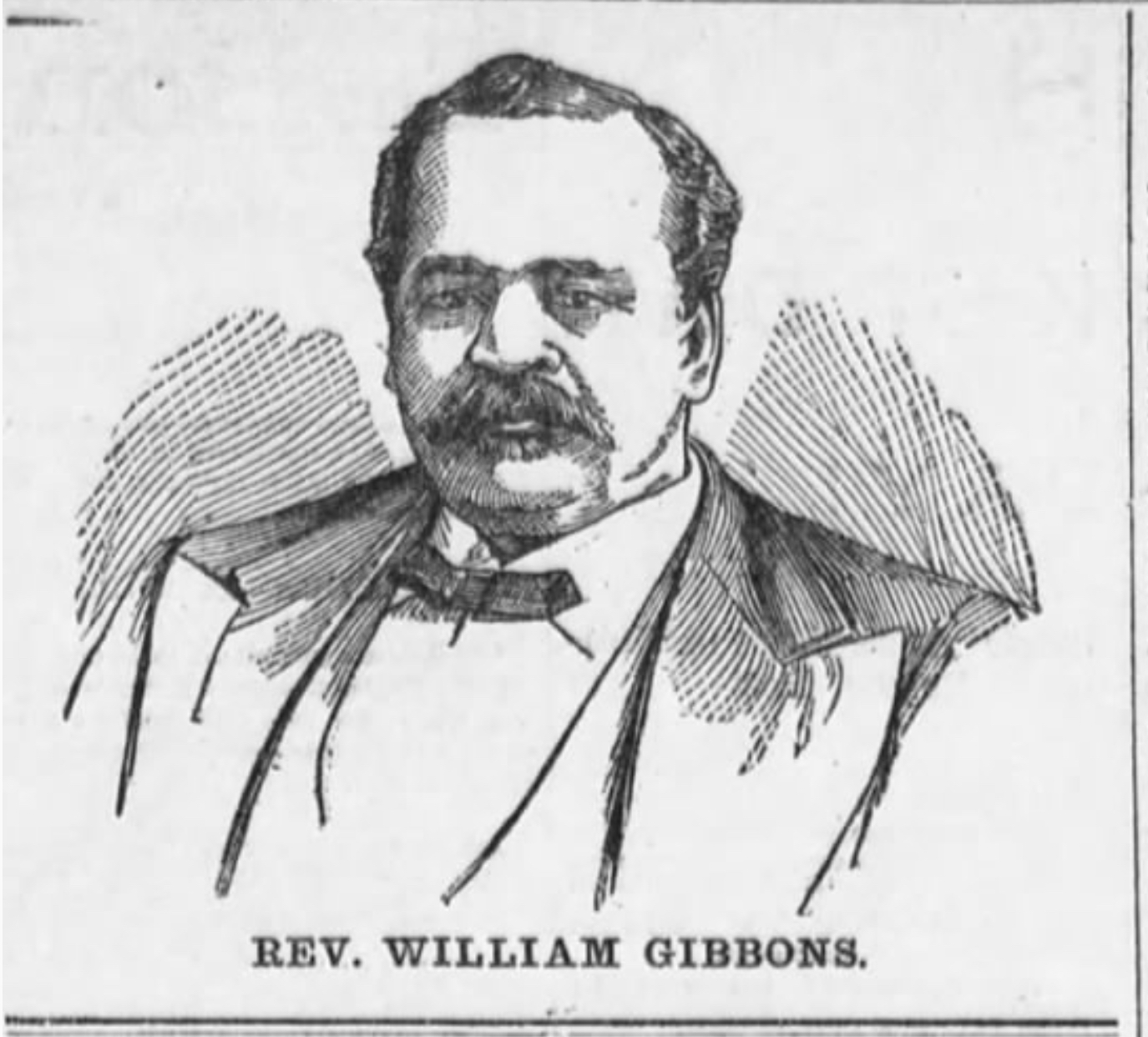
- Born: 1825; Albemarle County, Virginia, US
- Died: 1886 (aged 60–61); Washington, D.C., US
- Burial place: Charlottesville, Virginia
- Occupation: Baptist Minister
- Years active: 1866–1886
- Spouse: Isabella Gibbons

William Gibbons (1825 – June 28, 1886), was a formerly enslaved servant, who became a highly successful Baptist minister in Charlottesville and Washington, D.C. He was married to Isabella Gibbons.

== Under slavery ==
William Gibbons was born into slavery in Albemarle County, Virginia. His parents and first owners are unknown. In the 1840s, he was sold to Henry Howard, M.D., professor of anatomy and surgery at the University of Virginia, and he was then hired out to William McGuffey, who had married one of Howard's daughters. He served as butler. His owner allowed him to preach to students, even though this was against the law in Virginia; He "later recounted that he had become a minister in 1844, although we know little about this."

"He was a general favorite with all classes, and no one had more friends than he."

== First Baptist Church of Charlottesville ==
Gibbons was ordained a minister of the gospel in 1866; he was called a "lay minister" or "licentiate", although the meaning of the latter term is unclear. Licentiate, a person with official permission to work in a particular profession. In 1867 he accepted a call to the pulpit at Charlottesville's first Black church, the First Baptist Church of Charlottesville. As of early 1863, when the Emancipation Proclamation freed all the enslaved in Confederate territory, Black worshippers did not want any longer to be required to sit in the balcony of the First Baptist Church and to be outvoted routinely on issues of importance to them; they also felt that the minister discriminated against free blacks. The Church split into Black and White congregations with the same name in the same building, although at first the Black church was required under Virginia law to have a White minister and white trustees, so the same minister led both congregations. Gibbons was the church's first Black minister, after the Union military government made Virginia laws temporarily irrelevant.

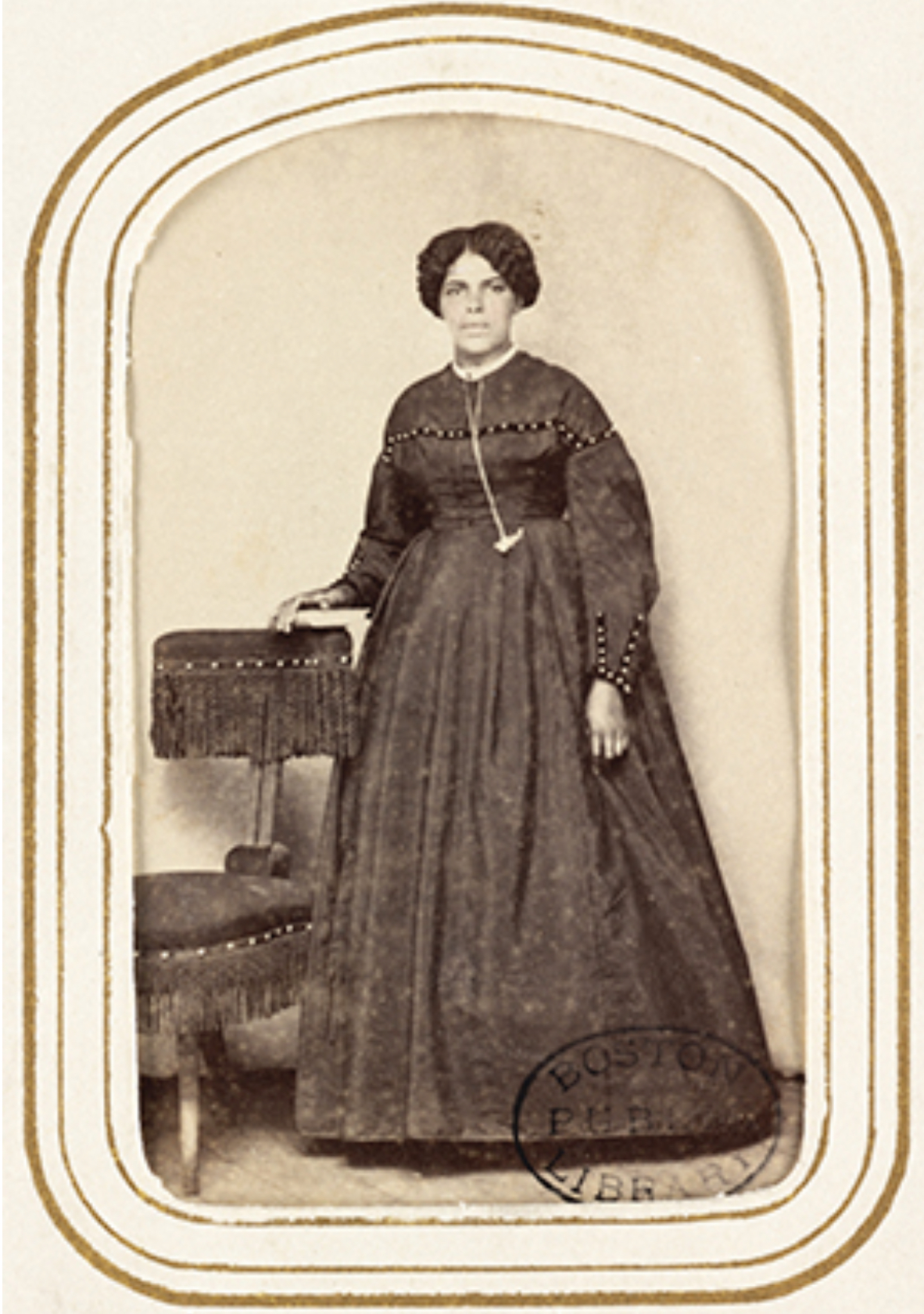
Isabella Gibbons

The Black church soon acquired its own home, the former Delevan Hotel, and was for a few years the Delevan Baptist Church. The school in which Isabella taught was housed in the church basement.

== Zion Baptist Church, Washington, D.C. ==
According to his obituary, William came to Washington in 1867 and the following year was installed as pastor of the Zion Baptist Church; a different source says that William did not become minister in Charlottesville until 1870. The published history of the First Baptist Church of Charlottesville states that "from the information available it is impossible to establish accurately the dates of all of the eleven pastors of the church between 1863 and 1914." It reports Gibbons' pastorate ended in 1870, after "about two years" of service.

However, Isabella's sponsoring agency said in 1874 that it was in serious financial difficulty; they were closing schools and their monthly publication had become yearly. The Delevan Hotel building, housing both Isabella's school and William's church, was condemned and torn down in 1876 and a replacement was not ready until 1884. At the same time references to her as a teacher in Charlottesville disappear, references to William as a Washington pastor start to appear, so the couple may have moved to Washington about 1875, or the couple may have lived separately from 1870 to 1874.

He held his position at the Zion Baptist Church until his death in 1886. Under him the church grew from 200 to 1,700 members. When he died in June 1886, 10,000 mourners attended his funeral, the Washington Post reported in a front-page story. The National Republican estimated the crowd at 5,000, adding that "it was almost impossible to get within a block of the building".

The entire board of the church accompanied his remains to Charlottesville, where he was buried in Oakwood Cemetery. After her death in 1890, Isabella's remains were also taken from Washington to Charlotteville, and interred there.

== Legacy ==
In 2015, the University of Virginia named its new residence hall Gibbons House, in honor of Isabella and William. In the public area are photos of them, interpretive panels on the walls, and a plaque about them.
