= Early admission =

Early admission is a college admission plan in which students apply earlier in the year than usual and receive their results early as well. This benefits students by reducing the number of applications to be completed at one time, and by providing results early. It benefits colleges as they generally know what their accepted student pool will look like before the regular admission process begins. Most colleges that participate in early admission request applications by October 15 or November 1 and return results by December 15.

On September 12, 2006, Harvard University ended its early decision program, a move that had profound effects on college admissions nationwide. Harvard Dean of Admissions William R. Fitzsimmons explained the move was intended to decrease the privileging of wealthy applicants by the early decision process. In 2007, the University of Florida, the University of Virginia, the University of North Carolina at Chapel Hill, and Princeton University joined Harvard when they announced that they were discontinuing their early decision program in an effort to help foster economic diversity in their student bodies. In 2011, Harvard University, Princeton University and several others reinstated their early decision programs.

Common early decision plans include:

- Early action — a program that is not binding
- Early decision — a program that is binding

== See also ==
- College admissions
- Rolling admission
