= Early action =

Type of university early admission process

Early action (EA) is a type of early admission process offered by some institutions for admission to colleges and universities in the United States. Unlike the regular admissions process, EA usually requires students to submit an application by mid-October or early November of their senior year of high school instead of January 1. Students are notified of the school's decision by early January instead of mid-March or May 1.

In this way, it is similar to many colleges' Early Decision (ED) programs. Some colleges offer both ED and EA. ED, however, is a binding commitment to enroll; that is, if accepted under ED, the applicant must withdraw all other applications and enroll at that institution. Thus, ED does not allow applicants to apply to more than one ED school simultaneously. Early Action, on the other hand, allows candidates to decline the offer if accepted, and depending on the program, it may be possible for a candidate to apply to one or more EA schools, plus one ED school. EA can be the best choice for students who know they prefer one particular school since a student will know the result of the application sooner, and to varying extents allows a student to compare aid offers from different schools.

== History ==
Harvard University, Princeton University, and the University of Virginia dropped all early admissions processes (which were binding early admission programs) in 2007. The primary reason was a perception that early admission favored some candidate types:

Until 2006, UVA offered an “early decision” program, in which students applied early in exchange for a binding commitment to attend if accepted. The program was abolished in 2007 amid concerns that the early decision application pool lacked racial and socioeconomic diversity.

All three reversed course in February 2011, restoring an early-admission program, though less restrictive than previous offerings. Yale University and Stanford University switched from early decision to restrictive single-choice early action in the fall of 2002 (for the Class of 2007). Schools that offer non-restrictive early action include UNC-Chapel Hill, the University of Chicago, Villanova University, and Massachusetts Institute of Technology. The University of Notre Dame and Georgetown University also offer early action plans containing various restrictions, but less restrictive than single choice.

EA drives a large volume of applications (helping to lower the school's admission rate and increasing its selectivity) but hurts the admission yield (many admitted students are free to go elsewhere). For applications subsequent to fall 2019 (for the Class of 2024+), Boston College eliminated its non-binding EA plan in favor of a new ED plan. Chicago also has adopted ED plans starting with the Class of 2021 but unlike Boston College, Chicago decided to maintain its EA plan. Virginia has also decided to add an ED plan to its EA offering beginning with the Class of 2024.

== Types ==
There are two types of EA programs: restrictive early action and non-restrictive early action. Restrictive Early Action (REA) allows candidates to apply to only one early action institution and to no institutions for early decision, while there are no such restrictions on non-restrictive early action. Regardless, the applicant is still permitted to reject any offer of admission in both types of early action.

The rules or policies for Early Action vary widely across schools and it is important for the applicant to be aware of any restrictions.

- Harvard, Princeton, and Yale have a Single-Choice Early Action program (SCEA), which restricts the applicant to apply early action to one school with a few exceptions and generally prohibits applying to any binding early admission programs.
- Stanford and Caltech have a Restrictive Early Action (REA) policy which prohibits applying to any private schools under their early program (binding or non binding) and prohibits applying to any public universities under a binding program - but a deferred EA applicant may apply under Early Decision II to other schools.
- Notre Dame and Georgetown offer a restrictive, but not single-choice early action program, allowing the applicant to apply elsewhere as long as the other application is not of a binding nature that would not commit the student to attending the other college.
- MIT has a non-binding EA plan, but it states that while students are free to apply to early plans or binding ED plans elsewhere, "MIT requires that you respect those rules" in effect at the other schools with regard to those applications (emphasis in original). As an example, a student applying under Restrictive Early Action to Stanford would be violating the Stanford policy by applying Early Action to MIT also.
- The majority of schools offering EA use an unrestricted EA plan but because of the unrestricted nature, these EA plans receive a very large number of applications and the admission rate for this pool is correspondingly low. As of 2019, schools with unrestricted EA plan include Chicago, Tulane, Villanova, Michigan, Georgia Tech, UNC-Chapel Hill, Virginia, Colorado College and a few others. For example, Colorado College reveals that for the Class of 2023, its ED pool had an admit rate of 27%, but its EA pool had only a 15% admit rate, compared to 5% for Regular Decision (overall admit rate was 13.5%)

== Admission rate ==
Whereas the admission rate for ED tends to be much higher than the rate for Regular Decision (RD) at most schools, EA generally does not offer much of an admissions edge because it is non-binding. EA drives a large volume of applications (helping to lower the school's admission rate and increasing its selectivity) but hurts the admission yield (many admitted students are free to go elsewhere).

The EA admission rate is notably higher at some public institutions, however. The EA admit rate for the Class of 2022 for Georgia Tech, UNC and Virginia was 25.8%, 30.4% and 27.8%, compared to the overall admit rate of 22.6%, 21.9% and 26.4% respectively with a majority of applicants applying through EA rather than Regular Decision.

At the more restrictive EA schools, there is a significant difference in admit rate between EA and RD. In that sense, SCEA or REA is comparable to ED in having a significantly higher admit rate. These schools likely recognize that their SCEA or REA applicants are "giving up" an early application at another school.

Admit Rates for Class of 2023, Early Action v Regular Decision Source: University publications and news releases (figures subject to change)
School	Total App- licants	Total Admits	Admit Rate	EA App- licants	EA Admits	EA Admit Rate	RD Applicants (excludes deferred EA Apps)	RD Admits	RD Admit Rate
Harvard	43330	2009	4.6%	6958	935	13.4%	36372	1074	3.0%
Yale	36844	2269	6.2%	6069	794	13.1%	30775	1475	4.8%
Princeton	32804	1896	5.8%	5335	743	13.9%	27469	1153	4.2%
Stanford	47452	2071	4.4%	n.a.	750	n.a.	n.a.	1321	n.a.
MIT	21312	1427	6.7%	9600	707	7.4%	11712	720	6.1%
Georgetown	22788	3202	14.1%	7802	919	11.8%	14986	2283	15.2%
Notre Dame	22199	3516	15.8%	7317	1532	20.9%	14882	1984	13.3%
Georgia Tech	36936	~6944	18.8%	20289	~4000	19.7%	16647	~2944	17.7%
Georgia Tech (in State)	-	-	37.7%	-	-	39.6%	-	-	-
Georgia Tech (out of State)	-	-	14.9%	-	-	14%	-	-	-
UNC-CH	43473	9524	21.9%	25867	7867	30.4%	17606	1657	9.4%
UNC-CH (in State)	13932	5699	40.9%	~10650	5125	48%	~3282	574	17.5%
UNC-CH (out of State)	29541	3825	12.9%	~15217	2742	18%	~14324	1083	7.6%
Michigan	65716	14949	22.7%	n.a.	n.a.	n.a.	n.a.	n.a.	n.a.
Virginia	40869	9787	23.9%	25126	6550	26.1%	15743	3237	20.6%
Virginia (in State)	12010	4331	36.1%	7019	3051	43.5%	4991	1280	25.6%
Virginia (out of State)	28859	5456	18.9%	18079	3499	19.4%	10780	1957	18.2%

According to Uni in the USA, "The advantage [of early action applications] is you will know much earlier and can plan accordingly. The disadvantage is that candidates who apply this way tend to be much stronger and rejection is more likely than in the regular admission pool."

== See also ==
- College admissions
- Early decision
- Rolling admission
- College admissions in the United States
