= Rolling admission =

College admissions policy

Rolling admission is a policy used by many colleges and universities to admit freshmen to undergraduate programs. Many law schools in the United States also have rolling admissions policies. Under rolling admission, candidates are invited to submit their applications to the school anytime within a large window of time. The window is usually over six months long, and some schools do not have a previously specified end date (the window simply closes when all spots are filled). The school will then review the application and notify the applicant of their decision within a few weeks from submission.

== Advantages ==
Rolling admission may be less stressful for students, and university admissions offices have less data to process because applications do not all flow in at the same time. Students can finish their application anytime between the summer before their senior year and midway through their senior year and can submit it at leisure, taking the time to carefully review their application and not getting anxious about a nearing deadline. The school receives applications continuously rather than in one or two bursts and is thus able to spend more time on each application.

== Disadvantages ==
Most college guidance counselors advise that students submit their application soon after the school begins to accept them as many believe that colleges look more favorably on students who apply earlier in the year. Other times, schools may underestimate the number of students who will take the offer of admission, resulting in the number of spots filling rapidly; this can lead to more-qualified applicants being denied, in turn putting pressure on students who wait longer than others. Also, schools often use a first-come-first-served method to grant housing and financial aid to students. Applicants who believe rolling admission to mean no deadlines may miss the chance at housing or financial aid that they would have had if there was one set deadline.

== See also ==
- College admissions
- College admissions in the United States
- Early action
- Early decision
- Transfer admissions in the United States
