= Early decision =

College admissions policy

Early decision (ED) or early acceptance is a type of early admission used in college admissions in the United States for admitting freshmen to undergraduate programs. It is used to indicate to the university or college that the candidate considers that institution to be their top choice through a binding commitment to enroll; in other words, if offered admission under an ED program, and the financial aid offered by the school is acceptable, the candidate must enroll at that institution and withdraw all applications to other institutions. Applying early decision brings a greater statistical chance of being accepted.

Candidates applying early decision typically submit their applications mid-October to early November of their senior year of high school and receive a decision around mid-December. In contrast, students applying regular decision typically must submit their applications by January 1 and receive their admissions decision by April 1. Students can know sooner where they will attend, removing uncertainty and the need for multiple applications and the associated costs.

Typically, a candidate who has applied early decision can receive one of three outcomes in December. They may be admitted (bound to attend the school which admitted them), rejected (they will not be able to attend the school), or deferred (they will be reconsidered for admission with the second round of early decision applications or with the regular decision pool and notified later with their final decision). Generally, when an applicant is deferred, they are released from their binding commitment.

== Alternatives ==
One alternative to early decision is early action (EA). Some institutions offer both early decision or early action, while others only offer one. Early action is non-binding, so a student admitted to a school early action could choose not to enroll in that school. Furthermore, ED programs require applicants to file only one ED application, while, depending on the institution, EA programs may be restrictive or non-restrictive and allow candidates to apply to more than one institution.

Many colleges now offer a second early decision plan: early decision II (ED II). The application typically due in late December to early January and decision in mid-February. Although the application deadline of early January is the same as for regular decision, the early decision II application is a binding commitment, with the benefits and drawbacks to the applicant and the college being similar to early decision I in most respects. The early decision II timeline is designed to allow students to apply to a new "first choice" school after they find out in mid- to late December they have been unsuccessful in their early decision or early action application to their original first choice, or to allow students that did not apply early decision I to apply under an early decision plan. It is intended as another chance for applicants to show commitment, and another tool for the school to protect its admission yield.

== History ==
It was in answer to criticisms of early decision that, starting in 2004, Yale and Stanford switched from early decision to single-choice early action. Harvard, Princeton, and the University of Virginia announced in the Fall of 2006 that they would no longer offer early action or early decision programs, which they claim favor the affluent, and moved to a single deadline instead. The University of Florida followed suit the following year. However, the University of Virginia, followed by both Harvard and Princeton, reinstated their single-choice early action program to promote diversity and provide opportunities for students looking for such an option in 2011.

== Binding commitment ==
Early decision is a binding decision, meaning that students must withdraw applications to other schools if accepted. It is not legally binding, but there is a commitment involved with penalties for withdrawing for spurious reasons. Advisers suggest that this method is only for students who are absolutely certain about wanting to attend a specific school. If financial aid is a concern or if a family is "shopping for the best deal", then it is usually advised to apply early action or regular decision instead. The one stipulated situation under which a student may back out of the agreement is if the financial aid offer is insufficient.

A student who backs out for other reasons may be "blacklisted" by the early decision college, which may contact the student's high school guidance office, and prevent it from sending transcripts to other colleges, and high schools generally comply with such requests. In addition, the jilted college may contact other colleges about the withdrawal, and the other colleges would likely revoke their offers of acceptance as well.

Critics of the program argue that binding an applicant, especially one that is typically seventeen or eighteen years old, to a single institution is unnecessarily restrictive.

== Impact on financial aid ==
When admitted as an early decision applicant, with no other acceptances in hand, a student's bargaining position is weaker because the student cannot compare offers from different colleges. Since the applicant is declaring an intention to attend if accepted, the school can "pinpoint the smallest amount of financial aid it will take for the student to attend." The applicant who is sensitive to financial aid may suffer from the likelihood of the aid amount being less than the expected amount. Several reports confirm that early decision applicants tend to come from wealthier families.

A contrasting view is that by applying earlier in the year, the accepted ED students have "first crack at the money," particularly at competitive schools without large endowments. In any case, if a highly desirable ED admittee may withdraw because of financial concerns, the college "may pull out all the stops" to prevent this, and that the possibility of backing out for financial reasons gives an applicant some form of negotiating leverage. Universities with very large endowments may be unique in their ability to provide aid equally generously to students regardless of their application plan.

== Benefits for colleges ==
Schools which offer early decision benefit from a near certainty that the applicant will attend if admitted. As a result, the admission yield is increased by admitting more students at the ED stage. The timing of the ED process also helps admissions offices spread the work of sifting through applications throughout more of the school year. A number of schools which had EA plans have recently added ED plans to EA (Chicago and Tulane from Class of 2021 on, Virginia from Class of 2024), or have switched to ED and jettisoned EA (Boston College from Class of 2024 on).

Some college counselors speculate that ED can serve to mitigate the problem of students failing to matriculate to a particular school in favor of a "superior" one. For example, one college might only admit a candidate deemed qualified for another, 'superior' college under ED, for in regular decision, should that student be admitted to the 'superior' competitor, that student would be unlikely to attend the college that originally offered the ED admission.

== Admit rates and enrollment statistics ==
Applying early decision brings a greater statistical chance of being accepted, possibly doubling or tripling the chances of an acceptance letter. This is usually attributed to three factors: first, candidates who apply "early" can only present colleges with their transcripts until the end of junior year of high school and therefore must be particularly strong applicants with very persuasive transcripts; second, candidates who apply "early" have dedicated themselves to an institution and are more likely to match the institution's admission standards; third, student athletes sometimes apply "early" to their top choice school to demonstrate their commitment to a college varsity coach who, in turn, can push their applications in the admissions process. Some advisors suggest that early decision is the best choice for students who have clearly settled on one particular college.

In 2009, the average early acceptance rate according to one estimate was 15% greater than regular decision applicants. There is less agreement, however, whether it will help a borderline student win acceptance to a competitive college. Early decision candidates tend to have stronger educational credentials than regular decision candidates, and as a result, these candidates would have been admitted whether they applied by early or regular methods, and therefore the greater statistical likelihood of acceptance may have been explained by membership in the stronger applicant pool. But the commitment of an early decision application demonstrated by a borderline student can still be beneficial; "colleges really want qualified students who want them" and are more likely to offer acceptances to students ready to make a full commitment.

Most institutions include data on the number of ED applicants and ED admits in their annual Common Data Set (a few institutions do not release a Common Data Set at all), and trends for an individual institution can be readily complied. At the most competitive schools, the number of ED applicants has increased at a more rapid pace than regular decision applicants. Although the ED admit rate has declined at these schools in recent years, the absolute number of ED admits has managed to increase while the absolute number of regular decision admits has fallen rapidly and all the admit rates have also fallen.

A few schools have seen ED applicants more than double in the 2012–2019 period, including Rice (2,628 ED apps in 2019–20 compared to 1,230 ED apps in 2012–13), Emory, NYU (13,842 ED I and ED II apps in 2019–20; 5,778 in 2012–13), and Boston University (4,700 ED I and ED II apps in 2019–20; 1,069 in 2012–13). The number of ED admits has also doubled at NYU and Boston University over this period, and although the increase of ED admits at other schools has been less dramatic, that increase has nonetheless reduced the number of RD admits meaningfully because half the class or more is now being filled by ED admits. At WashU and NYU, about 60% of the class is now taken up at the ED stage.

In recent years, there has been a marked trend in the number of ED applicants, and in the proportion of the class being admitted via the ED process. As of 2019–20, almost every highly selective college (where admission rates are below 25%) admits more students through ED than it did a decade ago, but among them, there has been a remarkable shift in the admission strategy of a few schools resulting in as much as 60% of the class being selected from the ED pool compared to 30–35% only a few years ago.

A similar trend exists across the most competitive liberal arts colleges in early decision application and admission numbers, with over 50% of the class being filled at these schools from ED admits compared to only about 44% in 2012–13. Notably, the absolute number of ED admits has increased, even though the number of RD admits, the RD admit rate, the ED admit rate and the overall admit rate have all gone down.

Admission statistics for early decision (Note: Numbers include both ED I and ED II when a school offers more than one ED plan.) at US research universities with admit rate averaging <25% in Fall 2019–2022 16 universities: (Note: Schools which changed admission strategies in the 2012–2020 period have not been included: Northeastern, Tulane, Chicago, all of which currently use a combination of EA and ED but did not use ED in the earlier part of this period. Other selective schools with admit rates below 22% have versions of EA plans but currently no ED option: MIT, Stanford, Harvard, Yale, Princeton, Georgetown, Notre Dame. USC has neither ED nor EA admission plans.) Columbia, (Note: Columbia has not released ED admits from 2017–18 but it has released the number of ED applicants each year. An estimate of 700 ED admits is assumed for each year from 2017–18.) Brown, Penn, Dartmouth, Cornell, Duke, Northwestern, Vanderbilt, Johns Hopkins, Rice, WashU, Tufts, Carnegie Mellon, Emory, NYU, Boston University (data from Common Data Set or school publications)
Freshman Year	ED Apps (a)	ED Admits (b)	ED Admit Rate (b/a)	Total Enrollment (c)	Enrollment filled by ED Admits (b/c)	Total Apps (d)	Total Admits (e)	Overall Admit Rate (e/d)	RD Apps (Note: Since ED applicants may be deferred, the pool from which RD admits are selected is larger than the RD applicant pool when these deferred applicants are included. Consequently, the RD Admit Rate is slightly below the figures presented in this table.) (d-a)	RD Admits (e-b)	RD Admit Rate (Note: Since ED applicants may be deferred, the pool from which RD admits are selected is larger than the RD applicant pool when these deferred applicants are included. Consequently, the RD Admit Rate is slightly below the figures presented in this table.) (e-b)/(d-a)
2012–13	38,840	11,471	29.5%	32,373	35.4%	438,455	90,978	20.7%	399,615	79,507	19.9%
2013–14	41,668	11,965	28.7%	32,246	37.1%	461,805	89,149	19.3%	420,137	77,184	18.4%
2014–15	44,535	12,887	28.9%	33,325	38.7%	489,518	90,153	18.4%	444,983	77,266	17.4%
2015–16	48,104	13,281	27.6%	33,150	40.1%	506,421	89,428	17.7%	458,978	76,363	16.6%
2016–17	51,466	14,003	27.2%	33,546	41.7%	527,239	88,129	16.7%	476,490	74,373	15.6%
2017–18	55,128	14,800	26.8%	33,702	43.9%	545,256	84,015	15.4%	490,857	69,471	14.2%
2018–19	62,598	16,328	26.1%	33,843	48.2%	595,711	77,476	13.0%	533,482	61,287	11.5%
2019–20	71,776	16,787	23.4%	32,899	51.0%	624,089	72,266	11.6%	552,567	55,566	10.1%
2020–21	72,108	17,681	24.5%	33,495	52.8%	608,127	81,025	13.3%	536,019	63,344	11.8%
2021–22	90,193	18,963	21.0%	36,013	52.7%	775,015	74,468	9.6%	684,823	55,505	8.1%
2022–23	96,382	18.640	19.3%	34,197	54.5%	799,027	69,704	8.7%	702,645	51,064	7.3%
2023–24	103,411	18.818	18.2%	33,965	55.4%	807,144	64,815	8.0%	703,733	45,997	6.5%
2024–25 est	106,650	18.872	17.7%	34,216	55.2%	831,680	63,369	7.6%	725,030	44,497	6.1%

Admission statistics for early decision at US liberal arts colleges with admit rate averaging <25% in Fall 2019–2022 23 liberal arts colleges: Pomona, Claremont McKenna, Pitzer, Swarthmore, Bowdoin, Bates, Colby, (Note: Colby has not yet released the 2017–18 and 2018–2019 common data sets, and the 2016–17 figures are used as estimates for those years.) Amherst, Williams, Barnard, Harvey Mudd, Colorado College, Middlebury, Wesleyan, Hamilton, Colgate, Vassar, Haverford, Carleton, Davidson, Wellesley, Washington & Lee, Grinnell (data from Common Data Set or school publications)
Freshman Year	ED Apps (a)	ED Admits (b)	ED Admit Rate (b/a)	Total Enrollment (c)	Enrollment filled by ED Admits (b/c)	Total Apps (d)	Total Admits (e)	Overall Admit Rate (e/d)	RD Apps (d-a)	RD Admits (e-b)	RD Admit Rate (e-b)/(d-a)
2012–13	13,018	4,988	38.3%	11,275	44.2%	137,864	29,517	21.4%	124,846	24,529	19.6%
2013–14	13,908	5,175	37.2%	11,299	45.8%	141,246	28,820	20.4%	127,338	23,645	18.6%
2014–15	14,214	5,117	36.0%	11,387	44.9%	143,625	29,346	20.4%	129,411	24,229	18.7%
2015–16	15,233	5,355	35.2%	11,493	46.6%	153,964	29,853	19.4%	138,731	24,498	17.7%
2016–17	15,100	5,622	37.2%	11,467	49.0%	157,988	29,188	18.5%	142,888	23,566	16.5%
2017–18	16,247	5,850	36.0%	11,540	50.7%	166,967	29,168	17.5%	150,720	23,318	15.5%
2018–19	17,496	5,972	34.1%	11,808	50.6%	184,066	29,585	16.1%	166,570	23,613	14.2%
2019–20	18,146	6,058	33.4%	11,641	52.0%	195,740	28,613	14.6%	177,594	22,555	12.7%
2020–21	17,983	6,217	34.6%	11,006	56.5%	188,271	30,660	16.3%	170,288	24,443	14.4%
2021–22	19,138	6,592	34.4%	12,822	51.4%	226,249	29,888	13.2%	207,111	23,296	11.2%
2022–23	21,014	6,647	31.6%	11,976	55.5%	239,926	28,039	11.7%	218,912	21,392	9.8%
2023–24	23,423	6,568	28.0%	11,834	55.5%	237,730	28,403	11.9%	214,307	21,835	10.2%
2024–25 est	24,784	6,621	26.7%	11,865	55.8%	250,516	29,761	11.9%	225,732	23,140	10.3%

== See also ==
- University and college admission
- Early action
- Rolling admission
- The Early Admissions Game
