= The Rotunda (University of Virginia) =

Historic building at the University of Virginia

- Rotunda, University of Virginia
- U.S. National Register of Historic Places
- U.S. National Historic Landmark
- U.S. National Historic Landmark District – Contributing property
- Virginia Landmarks Register
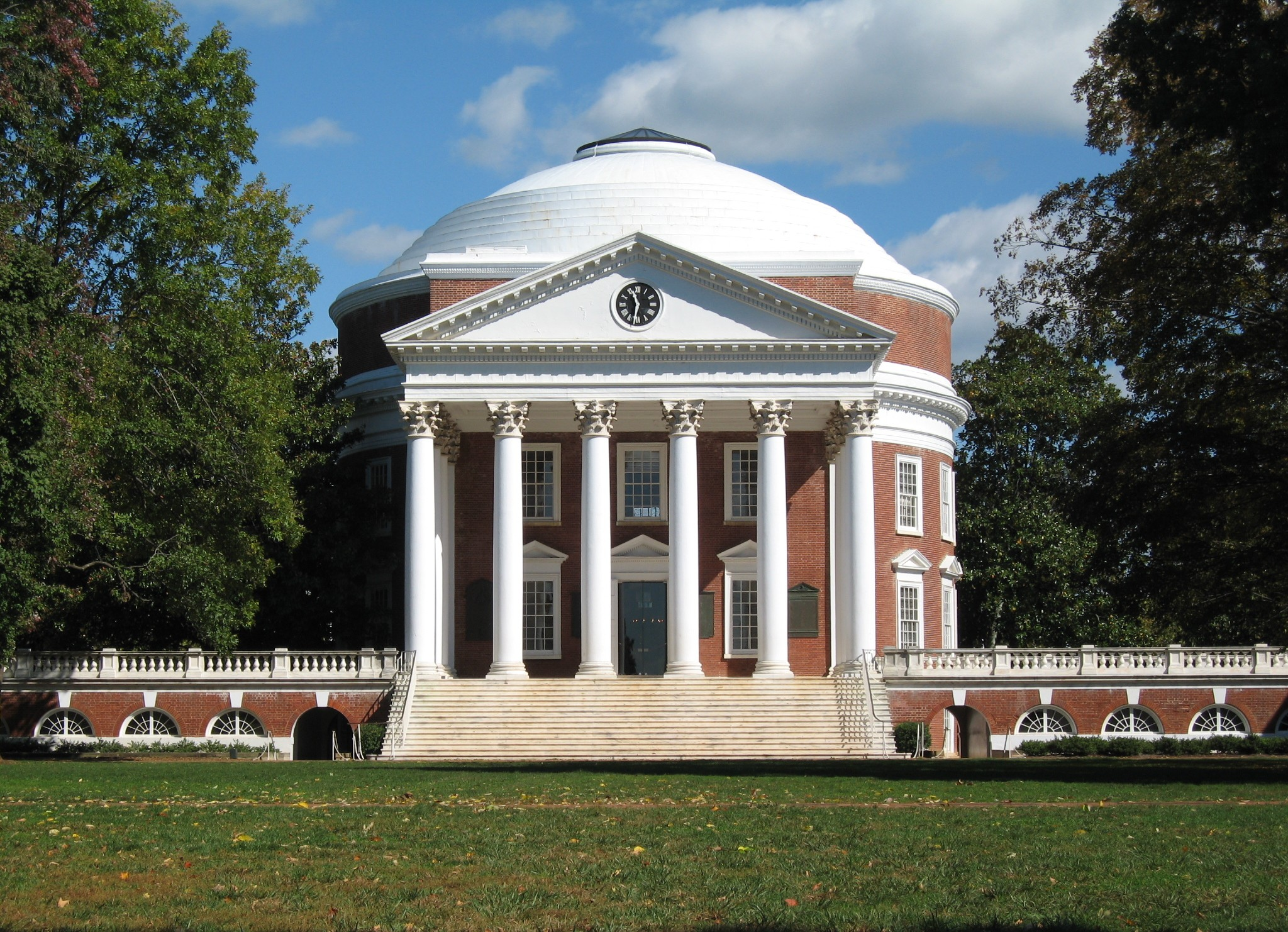
- The Rotunda
- Interactive map of Rotunda, University of Virginia
- Location: Charlottesville, Virginia, U.S.
- Built: 1822–1826
- Architect: Thomas Jefferson; Stanford White
- Architectural style: Early Republic, Neoclassical
- Part of: University of Virginia Historic District (ID70000865)
- NRHP reference No.: 66000937
- VLR No.: 002-5055

Significant dates
- Added to NRHP: October 15, 1966
- Designated NHL: December 21, 1965
- Designated NHLDCP: November 11, 1971
- Designated VLR: September 9, 1969

The Rotunda is a building located on the Lawn on the original grounds of the University of Virginia. Thomas Jefferson designed it to represent the "authority of nature and power of reason" and modeled it after the Pantheon in Rome. Construction began in 1822 and was completed shortly after Jefferson's death in 1826. The campus of the new university was unique in that its buildings surrounded a library (the principal function of the Rotunda) rather than a church, as was common at other universities in the English-speaking world. To many, the Rotunda symbolizes Jefferson's belief in the separation of church and education, and represents his lifelong dedication to education and architecture. The Rotunda was designated a National Historic Landmark in 1966, and is part of the University of Virginia Historic District, designated in 1971.

The collegiate structure, the immediate area around it, and Jefferson's nearby home at Monticello combine to form one of only six modern man-made sites in the United States to be internationally protected and preserved as a World Heritage Site by UNESCO (the other five are the Old City of San Juan, the San Antonio Missions, Independence Hall, the Statue of Liberty, and the architectural works of Frank Lloyd Wright).

The original construction cost of the Rotunda was $57,773 ($992,792 in 2006 dollars). The building stands 77 feet (23.5 m) in both height and diameter.

== History ==
=== Design influences ===
Jefferson's design was influenced by the architectural drawings of Andrea Palladio and is an example of Palladian architecture. The direct source for Jefferson's inspiration is believed to be a drawing of the Pantheon in the 1721 Leoni translation of Palladio, which Jefferson owned and referred to during the building process. While Jefferson used the detailed measurements of the Pantheon to guide the proportions of his Rotunda, the dimensions of his building are much smaller: the interior diameter of the Pantheon's dome is 143 feet, whereas the exterior diameter of Jefferson's dome is 77 feet, "being half that of the Pantheon and consequently one fourth in area, and one eighth in volume."

B. Henry Latrobe first proposed the domed central building at the head of the Lawn in a letter to Jefferson dated July 17, 1817, and Latrobe's influence on the design of the Rotunda is substantial. Jefferson's Pavilion III also is based on a design drawing from Latrobe.

Jefferson also deferred to Palladio's model for significant details of the building. In a letter to Thomas Appleton, then the United States consul in Liguria, Jefferson requested pricing for "ten Corinthian capitals for columns of 32 I. diminished diam. and 8 do. half capitals of the same diam. for pilasters of 30 minutes projection from the wall, to be copied from those of the Rotunda, or Pantheon, of Rome, as represented in Palladio."

=== Design and construction ===
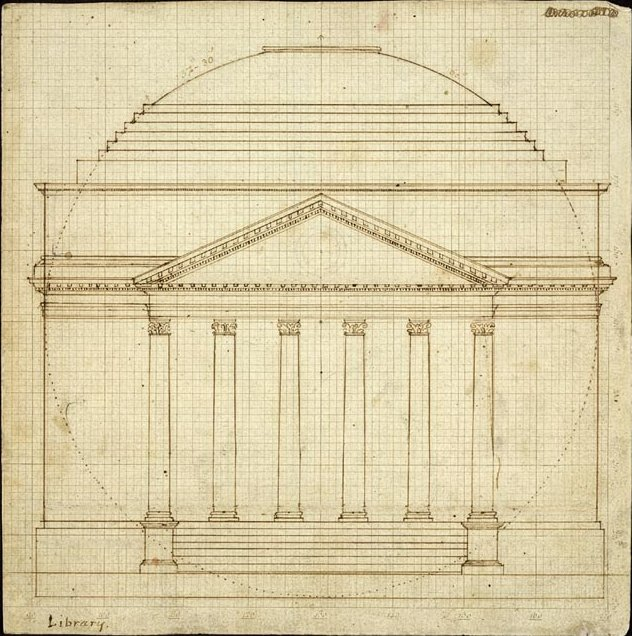
1819 draft of the Rotunda

During the Marquis de Lafayette's grand tour of the United States in 1824 and 1825, the Marquis and former President James Madison dined with Thomas Jefferson in the Dome Room of the unfinished Rotunda at the university's inaugural banquet, and Lafayette toasted Jefferson as the "Father of the University of Virginia". This moved Jefferson, and he later had the phrase inscribed on his grave. A bust of Lafayette was given to the university in 1904 by the Government of France to honor the friendship between the two men. Today it stands in the North Oval Room.

The building was constructed with slave labor alongside freed black and white laborers.

The university was the first to offer students specialization in the field of Astronomy, so Jefferson toyed with the idea of painting the interior of the Dome Room with images of the night sky to aid the students in their learning. He went so far as to begin designing a new mechanism with which students would be able to "float" through the air and study heavenly bodies from closer different viewpoints. They would also be equipped with a control to move the stars around the Dome. The idea was eventually abandoned but would have been the first planetarium in the United States. The Transit of Venus of 1882 was observed from the steps of the Rotunda, in a coordinated effort with McCormick Observatory.

=== Alterations ===
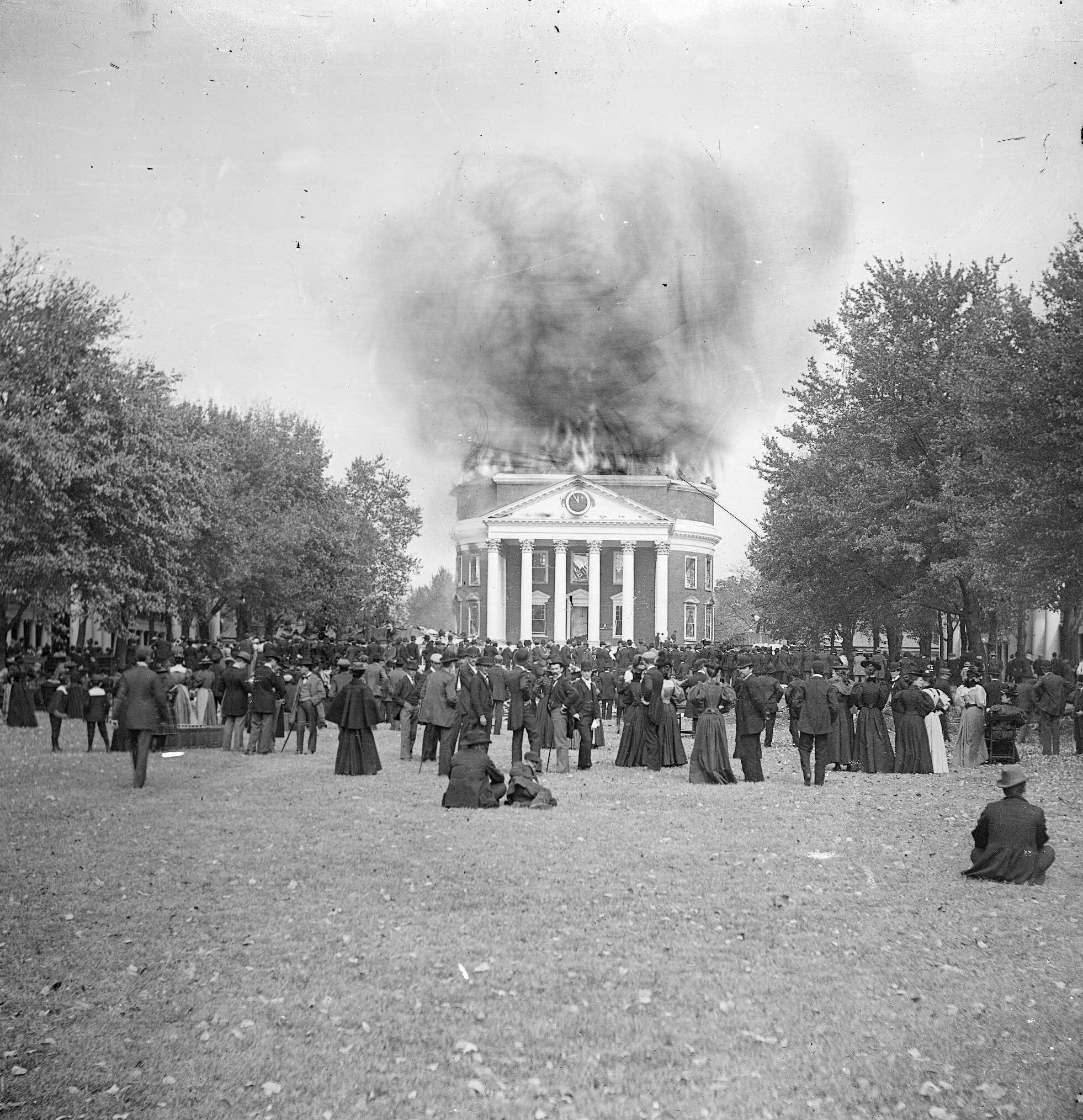
The Great Rotunda Fire in 1895

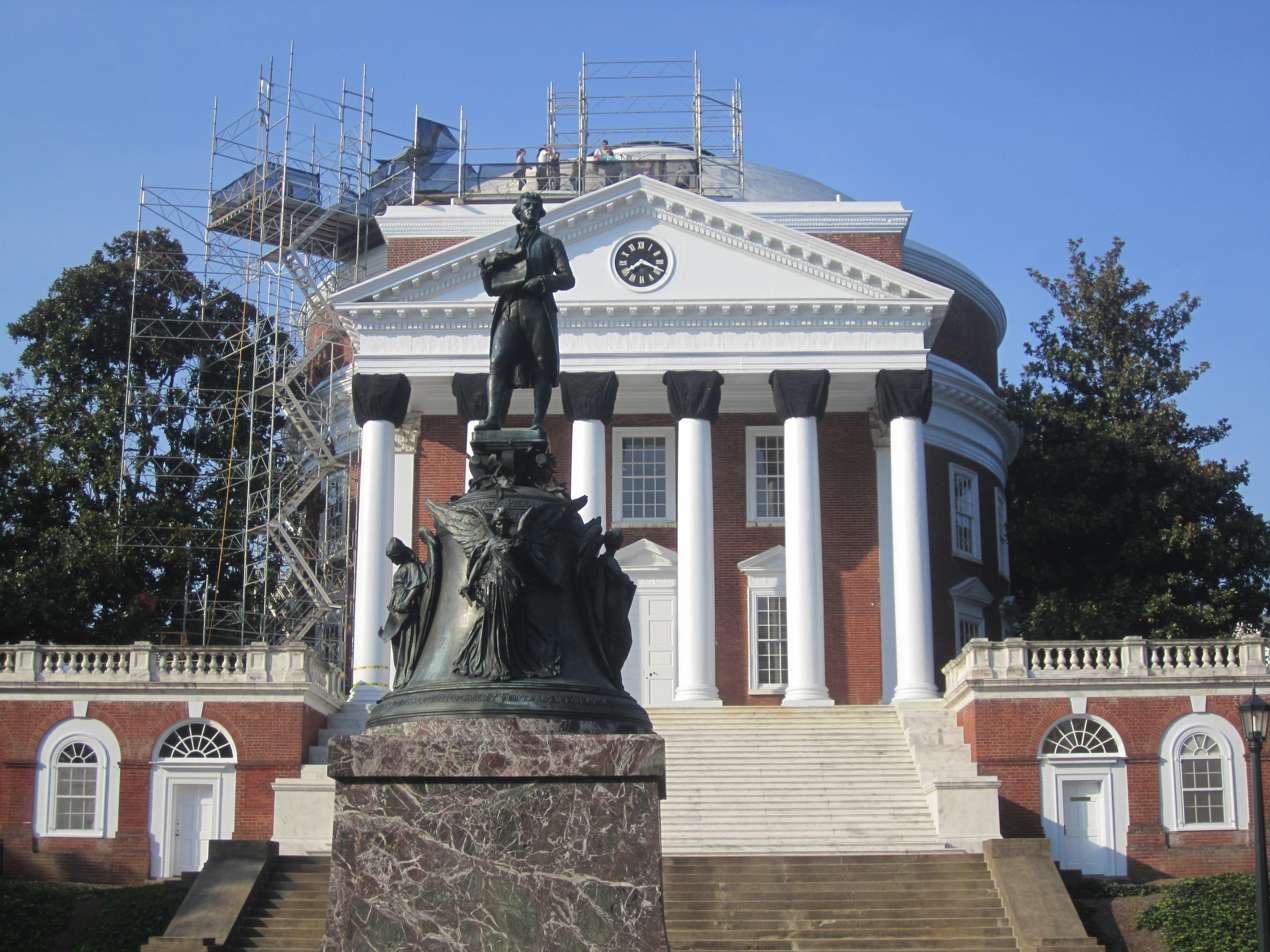
Renovation underway on the Rotunda in 2011, with the Thomas Jefferson statue in the foreground

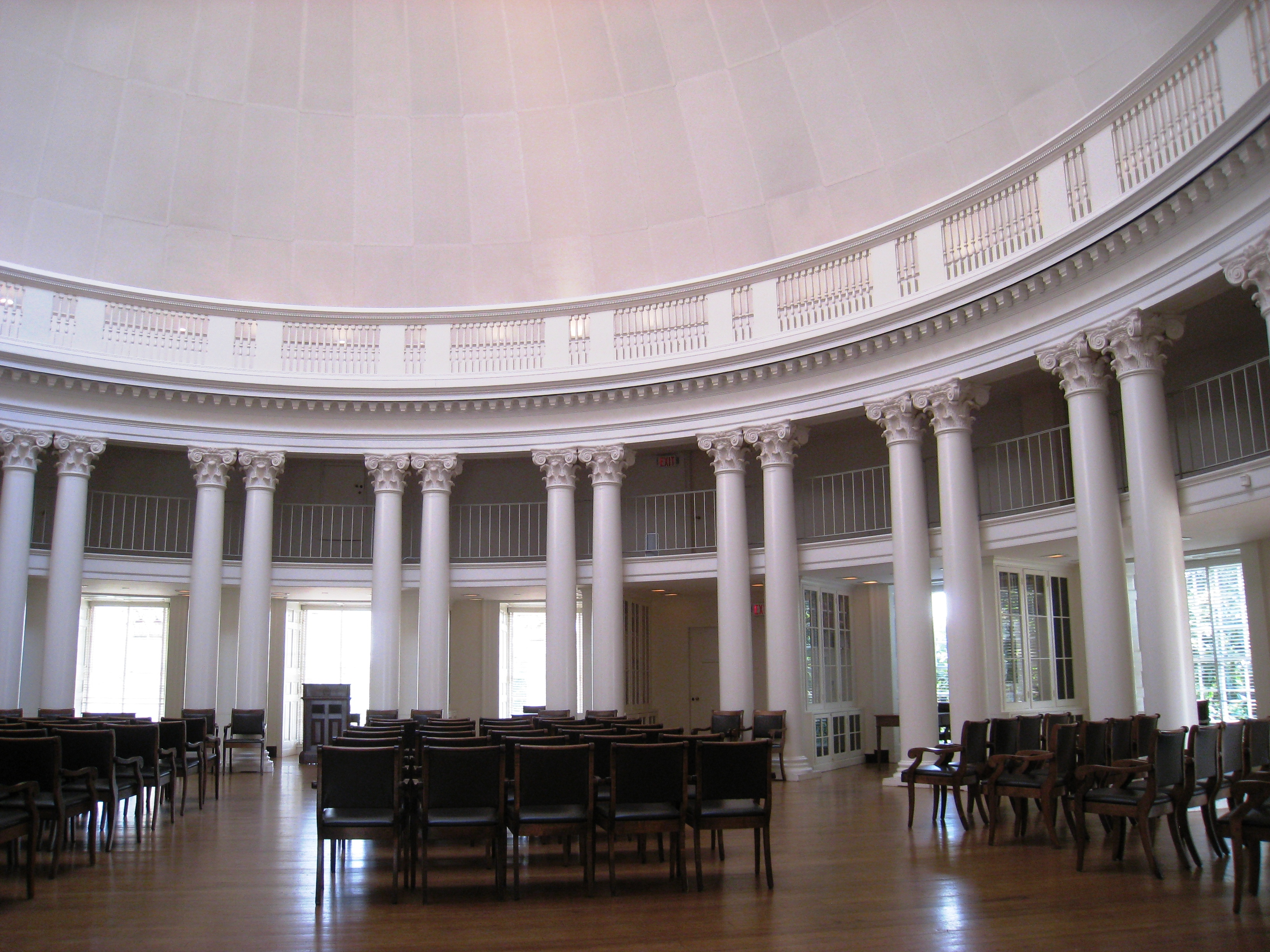
The Dome Room of the Rotunda in 2008

A structure called the Annex, also known as "New Hall," was added to the north side of the Rotunda in 1853 to provide additional classroom space needed due to overcrowding. (A rare photograph of the Annex may be viewed at the University of Virginia's online visual history collection.)

In 1895, the Rotunda was gutted by a fire that started in the Annex. University students saved what was, for them, the most important item within the Rotunda—a life-size likeness of Thomas Jefferson carved from marble that was given to the university by Alexander Galt in 1861. The students also rescued a portion of the books of the university library from the Dome Room, as well as various scientific instruments from the classrooms in the Annex.

Shortly after the fire, the university faculty recommended a program of rebuilding that called for the reconstruction of the Rotunda and the replacement of the lost classroom space of the Annex with a set of buildings at the south end of the Lawn. In the new design, the wooden dome was replaced with a fireproof tile dome by the Guastavino Company of New York in 1898–1899. The Rotunda was rebuilt with a modified design by Stanford White, a nationally known architect and partner in the New York City firm McKim, Mead, and White. Whereas Jefferson's Rotunda had three floors, White's had only two, but a larger Dome Room. The Annex was not rebuilt.

In 1976 during America's Bicentennial, White's Rotunda interior was gutted and rebuilt, at a cost of $2.4 million, to Jefferson's original design. In the Bicentennial issue of the AIA Journal, the American Institute of Architects called Jefferson's Rotunda, Lawn, and nearby home at Monticello "the proudest achievement of American architecture in the past 200 years".

There is a plaque, on the south side of the Rotunda, listing the names of students and graduates of the university who were killed during the Civil War. Other plaques on the south side list those killed during World War I while plaques on the north side list those killed in World War II and the Korean War.

Today, doctoral students defend their dissertations in the North Oval Room, and many events (including monthly dinners for residents of the Lawn) are held inside the Dome Room. Other events are held on the steps of the Rotunda, which is also the traditional starting point for students streaking the Lawn.

In 2012, the university began an extensive construction project to repair and renovate the aging Rotunda. The first phase of the project replaced the Rotunda's copper roof. Although the engineers were several months ahead of schedule, the roof remained as unpainted copper for the graduating class of 2013. During the renovation, a nineteenth-century chemistry laboratory was found within the walls on the bottom floor featuring a chemical hearth and a sophisticated ventilation system through a series of brick tunnels. The Rotunda reopened in September 2016.

== Legacy ==
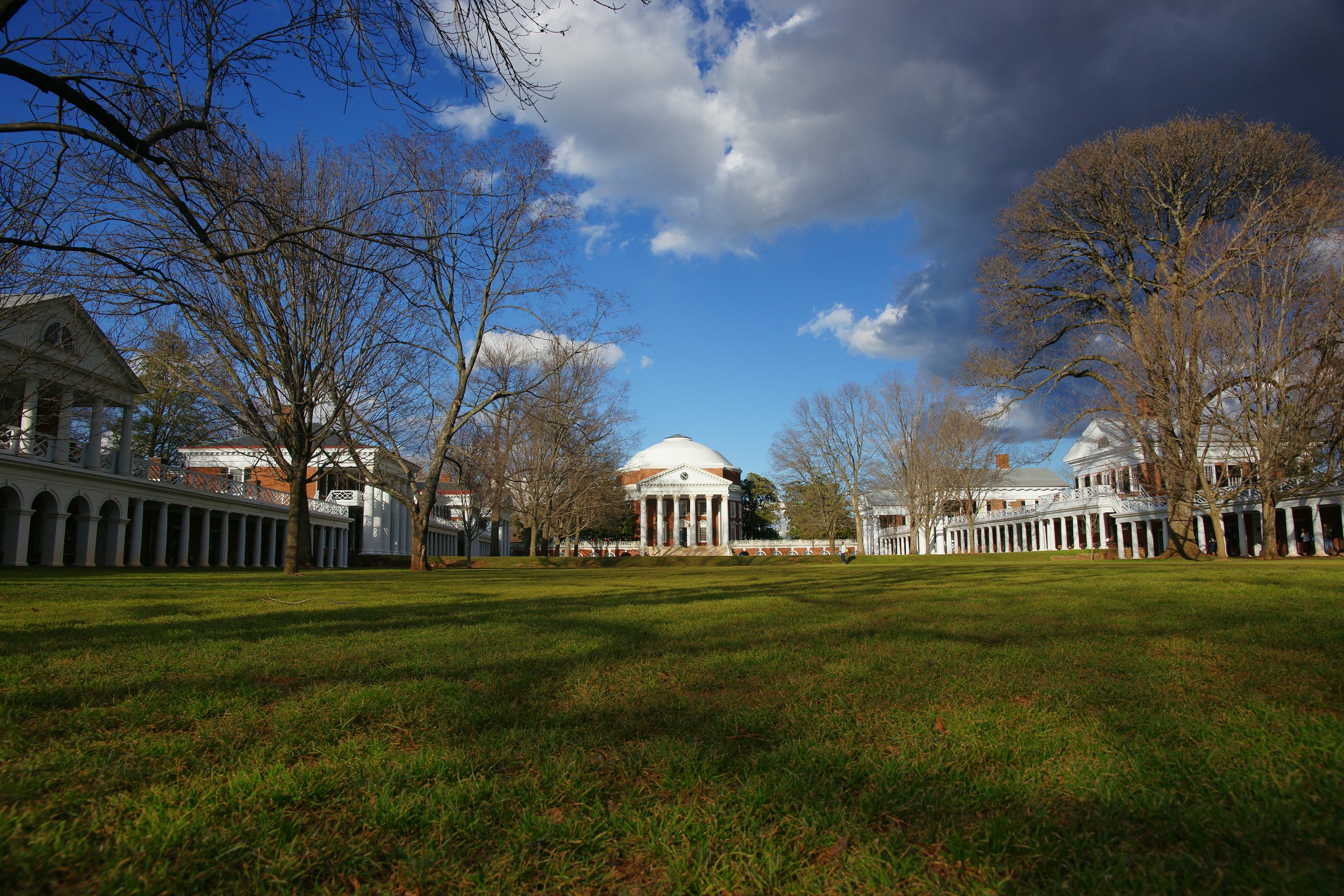
View from The Lawn to the Rotunda, 2010

Buildings inspired by the Rotunda and Lawn include the expansive green spaces headed by Rotunda-like buildings built at Duke University in 1892, Johns Hopkins University in 1902, the University of Illinois in 1907, Rice University in 1910, Peabody College of Vanderbilt University in 1915, the Green at the University of Delaware in 1916, Killian Court at MIT in 1916 and the "Grand Auditorium" of Tsinghua University in Beijing built in 1917. Additionally, Dallas Hall at Southern Methodist University (SMU), Hendricks Chapel at Syracuse University, Florida State University College of Law, and Grawemeyer Hall at the University of Louisville were modeled after Jefferson's Rotunda. The Sterling Divinity Quadrangle at Yale Divinity School (1932) was closely based on the Academical Village at the University of Virginia, but with the Marquand Chapel taking the place of the Rotunda.

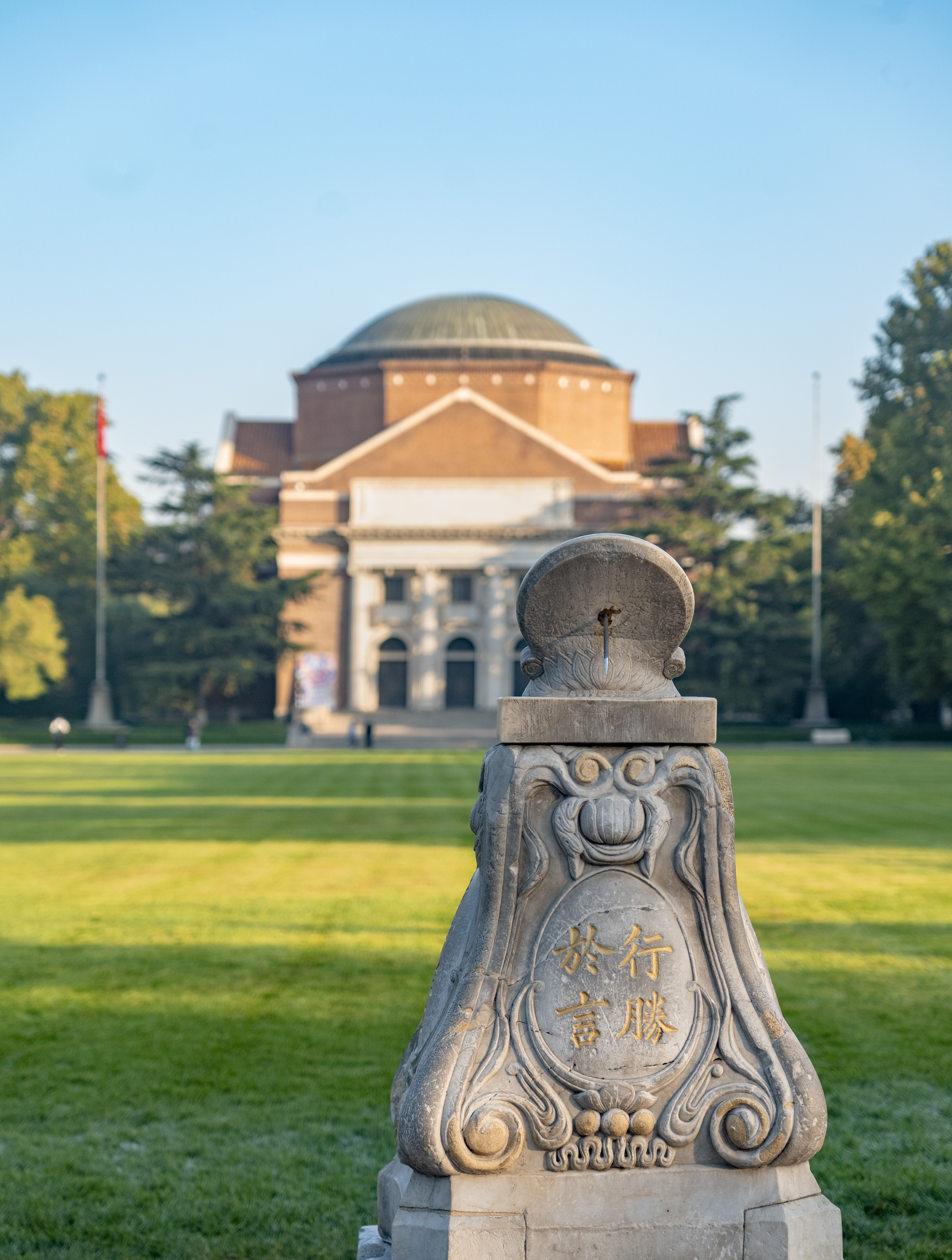
Tsinghua University's Grand Auditorium - inspired by the Rotunda

The original campus at the University of Alabama was modeled after Jefferson's Rotunda and Lawn. The Rotunda there, completed in 1833, also contained the university's library. However, it and most of the other public campus buildings were burned as part of Wilson's Raid during the American Civil War.

== See also ==
- Jeffersonian architecture
- List of National Historic Landmarks in Virginia
- Memorial to Enslaved Laborers (the same dimensions as the Rotunda)
- National Register of Historic Places listings in Albemarle County, Virginia
