= Henry Blair =

Henry Blair may refer to:

- Henry Blair (child actor), American film and radio actor
- Henry Blair (inventor) (1807–1860), second African American inventor to receive a patent
- Henry W. Blair (1834–1920), US representative and senator from New Hampshire

== See also ==
- Harry Blair (disambiguation)
