= Stolen Childhood =

1995 American history book by Wilma King

Stolen Childhood: Slave Youth in Nineteenth-Century America
- First edition cover, 1995
- Author: Wilma King
- Language: English
- Subject: Slavery, child slaves, African American families
- Published: 1995 (Indiana University Press)
- Publication place: United States
- Pages: 284 (1st ed.), 544 (2nd ed.)
- ISBN: 978-0-253-32904-2 (1st ed.), ISBN 978-0-253-22264-0 (2nd ed.)
- Dewey Decimal: 306.3
- LC Class: E441.K59

Stolen Childhood: Slave Youth in Nineteenth-Century America is a 1995 history book about nineteenth century slave children in America by Wilma King. As the first full-length book on the subject, it began the scholarship of slave childhood. The book uses historical documents to argue that enslaved children were deprived of experiences now understood to constitute childhood, due to early work responsibilities, frequent bodily and emotional trauma, and separations from family. The book covers themes of the children's education, leisure, religion, transitions to freedmen, and work expectations. It was published in the Indiana University Press's Blacks in the Diaspora series, and a revised edition was released in 2011.

Critics regarded Stolen Childhood positively for taking the historiography of children, slavery, and education in an unexplored direction. Scholars placed the book in a lineage of studies on slave families and women, with King's book as the first dedicated to slave children. Reviewers generally praised her research contribution but condemned the book's structure and repetitive style. The book won the 1997 Outstanding Book Award from the National College of Black Political Scientists. Choice named King's 2011 revised edition an "outstanding title" for academic libraries.

== Overview ==
Stolen Childhood: Slave Youth in Nineteenth-Century America broadly documents nineteenth century slave children and their lives. It was the first full-length book on the subject, and at the time of its publishing, the topic of enslaved children was underrepresented in American slavery scholarship. The book is part of Indiana University Press's Blacks in the Diaspora series, (Note: Indiana University Press's Blacks in the Diaspora series ran for 17 years with over 40 titles, mainly as tenure books for black women scholars on topics in black women's studies.) and was first published in 1995, with a revised edition in 2011. King taught history at Michigan State University when the first edition was released.

King argues that enslaved children did not have the opportunities for childhood and thus, did not have childhoods. Slave children instead worked as soon as they could, were often separated from caregivers and family, and were subject to punishment of many sorts, sometimes no different than those levied on adults. The children's trauma was compared to that of war—enduring abuses, sexual exploitation, inability to protect themselves—and they aged prematurely through these experiences.

The second edition doubles the book's length. It uses new material and demography, includes northern enslaved children and those in urban centers, details relations between free and enslaved children, tells of child abolitionists, and shows child life under black and Native American slaveowners. Forty percent of the original volume was notes.

== Synopsis ==
The book's eight (Note: The original title had seven chapters.) chapters address prominent themes affecting slave children, including education, leisure, religion, transitions to freedmen, and work expectations. Due to a lack of historical sources direct from children, the book focuses more on their socialization and stories of survival than their internal perspectives. King's evidence includes slave narratives, ex-slave interviews collected by the Works Progress Administration (WPA), plantation owner diaries, census records, newspapers, autobiographies, missionary reports, and Freedmen's Bureau records. She contrasts Northern and Southern slave life, as well as their ownership by whites, blacks, and Native Americans.

King shows how enslaved children were educated for survival and resistance. This education was usually informal and parental and taught how to deal with slaveowners and their abuse. King also named literacy and religion's role in their education. Kids were taught mutual cooperation as a virtue between slaves. Few slaves had formal education and those who did were artisans. Those educated or given religious training were only by the fortune of their owner's interests. King's stories tell of children in domestic, farm, and industrial work, who spent their free time in celebrations, dances, games, folk rituals, and hunting.

When unoccupied, the children tended to their own needs and played with toy marbles and hobby horses. Some learned to count by playing hide and seek. Play was primarily for inculcating virtuous traits like courage and loyalty, but it also made life more tolerable. Black and white children played together before the age of ten, but separated afterward based on the demands of work. Children often helped the adults, and performed chores (like fetching wood or water) that quickly escalated into full work responsibilities.

The children's degree of freedom depended on the mother's status. Their names were chosen in conjunction with the owners, who often lent their own surnames as slave names while families gave children African "day names". Slaveowner events were used to control the slave population, with a doubling social function for purposes of courtship. King emphasizes the role of the children in motivating families to reunite once free, though many made new families. The dependency of children also urged families to become financially independent. Slave children were generally in bad health with bodies smaller than usual. They frequently died young.

The volume continues briefly through the postwar period, where harsh experiences persisted even after slavery ended. For example, Black Codes apprenticeship laws were a means for former slave owners to own the labor of the formerly enslaved children. Other topics covered in the book include gradual abolition, parental teachings, pregnancy, and the importance of the family.

== Reception ==
Stolen Childhood was regarded as a critical contribution to the historiography of children, slavery, and education. The book won the 1997 Outstanding Book Award from the National College of Black Political Scientists. Choice marked the second edition as an "outstanding title" for academic libraries.

Stolen Childhood was seen to open the study of slave childhood. Multiple reviewers placed the book in a lineage of studies on slave families and women, alongside works such as Herbert Gutman's The Black Family in Slavery and Freedom, 1750–1925. V. P. Franklin noted that these works mentioned slave childhood, but that King's book delved into the topic. Jane Turner Censer, writing for The American Historical Review, traced the field to Willie Lee Rose's 1970 "Childhood in Bondage" through a half-dozen related historians of slave families. Marie Jenkins Schwartz in The Journal of Southern History expected King's study of childhood to fill a "large gap" in the lineage's literature. Thomas J. Davis summed the work as a "pioneering survey" in Library Journal.

Marie Jenkins Schwartz praised King's use of primary sources, passion for the topic, and photographs, but lamented the original release's lack of child psychological perspective and exactitude of parental involvement in their children's enslavement. She also criticized its "abrupt" postwar ending. James Marten also found the section rushed in The Register of the Kentucky Historical Society. Jane Turner Censer pointed to Brenda Stevenson's connection between slaves' brutal treatment and their force used on children as missing from the volume. As for its originality, she also said the book held "few surprises for historians of slavery". Joshua D. Rothman noted the same in the Journal of the Early Republic. Franklin, writing for History of Education Quarterly, preferred the sections on the unique realities facing these children, such as their relation to puberty and courting, and was not as interested in comparisons between slave children and adults. He bemoaned the original release's organization for only occasionally discussing these practices, and suggested organization by social practices instead of by activity to reduce redundancy. Censer and Marten also complained of this repetition. In The New York Times, Douglas A. Sylva thought the book suffered from weak style and structure, with good research lost in vague topic sentences and conclusions. Franklin additionally noted insufficient citation of relevant secondary literature and recommended a harsher edit, while Loren Schweninger upheld the book's citation quality and accounted for all "important secondary source[s]" on slavery in the back matter.

Ben Neal of the Tennessee Librarian questioned King's heavy use of Works Progress Administration-collected interview material, noting that the interviewees were too old to thoughtfully recall and express the complete spectrum of slave childhood. He then absolved King of fault for the otherwise dearth of data. Neal praised the book's accessibility for casual readers and academics alike. In The Journal of American History's review of the first edition, Loren Schweninger commended King's restrained use of the WPA sources with Neal’s same rationale. Schweninger also sought more comparisons between Southern regions and in interracial relationships. Jane Turner Censer agreed that the book treated the South and century too broadly where it could have noticed specific differences due to migration patterns, regional changes, and time. Richard H. Steckel in The Georgia Historical Quarterly similarly desired comparison between slave and working-class children of the era. Yet Roderick A. McDonald appreciated this broader perspective and emphasis on slave resilience and familial love in foil with two more negative and detailed, or narrower, studies (Them Dark Days by William Dusinberre and Life in Black and White by Brenda Stevenson) in his write-up for American Studies. Steckel added that he wanted to know more about the children's nutrition, and Marten felt several of King's smaller points were not fully substantiated.

Writing for Choice on the second edition, J. D. Smith recalled "rave reviews" for the original release and credited the book with making King "a leading scholar on African American slavery generally and ... an authority on slave youth culture". Smith described the book as "indispensable" and Steckel declared it "essential reading" for specialists in related fields. George M. Fredrickson in The New York Review of Books named the book with Norrece T. Jones' as "a little-noticed countertrend to ... culturalist approaches", and so underscored the sheer brutality of slave life after an age of literature that suggested other methods for understanding the slave-master relationship. Many reviewers recommended the book for scholarly libraries.

== See also ==
- Incidents in the Life of a Slave Girl, by former slave Harriet Jacobs, 1861

== Notes and references ==
Notes

King, Wilma (January 1998). "Stolen Childhood: Slave Youth in Nineteenth-Century America". African Diaspora Archaeology Newsletter. 5 (1).
