= Harry Blair =

Harry Blair may refer to:

- Harry Blair, musician in Tennessee Ramblers (North Carolina band)
- Harry Blair, character in Farewell Again

== See also ==
- Henry Blair (disambiguation)
- Harold Blair (1924–1976), Australian singer and Aboriginal activist
