= Human trafficking in Virginia =

Human trafficking in Virginia is the illegal trade of human beings for the purposes of reproductive slavery, commercial sexual exploitation, or forced labor as it occurs in the state of Virginia, and it is widely recognized as a modern-day form of slavery. It includes "the recruitment, transportation, transfer, harboring or receipt of persons by means of threat or use of force or other forms of coercion, of abduction, of fraud, of deception, of the abuse of power, or of a position of vulnerability or of the giving or receiving of payments or benefits to achieve the consent of a person having control over another person, for the purpose of exploitation. Exploitation shall include, at a minimum, the exploitation of prostitution of others or other forms of sexual exploitation, forced labor services, slavery or practices similar to slavery, servitude or the removal of organs."

According to officials with the Federal Bureau of Investigation, Immigration and Customs Enforcement and other law enforcement agencies, there is a growing problem with human trafficking in Virginia, particularly in connection with Latino gangs, including MS-13. Anti-human trafficking advocates argue that weak laws in Virginia are attracting traffickers from Washington D.C. and Maryland which have passed stricter laws. The National Human Trafficking Resource Center reported receiving 624 calls and emails in 2015 about human trafficking in Virginia.

== History of slavery ==
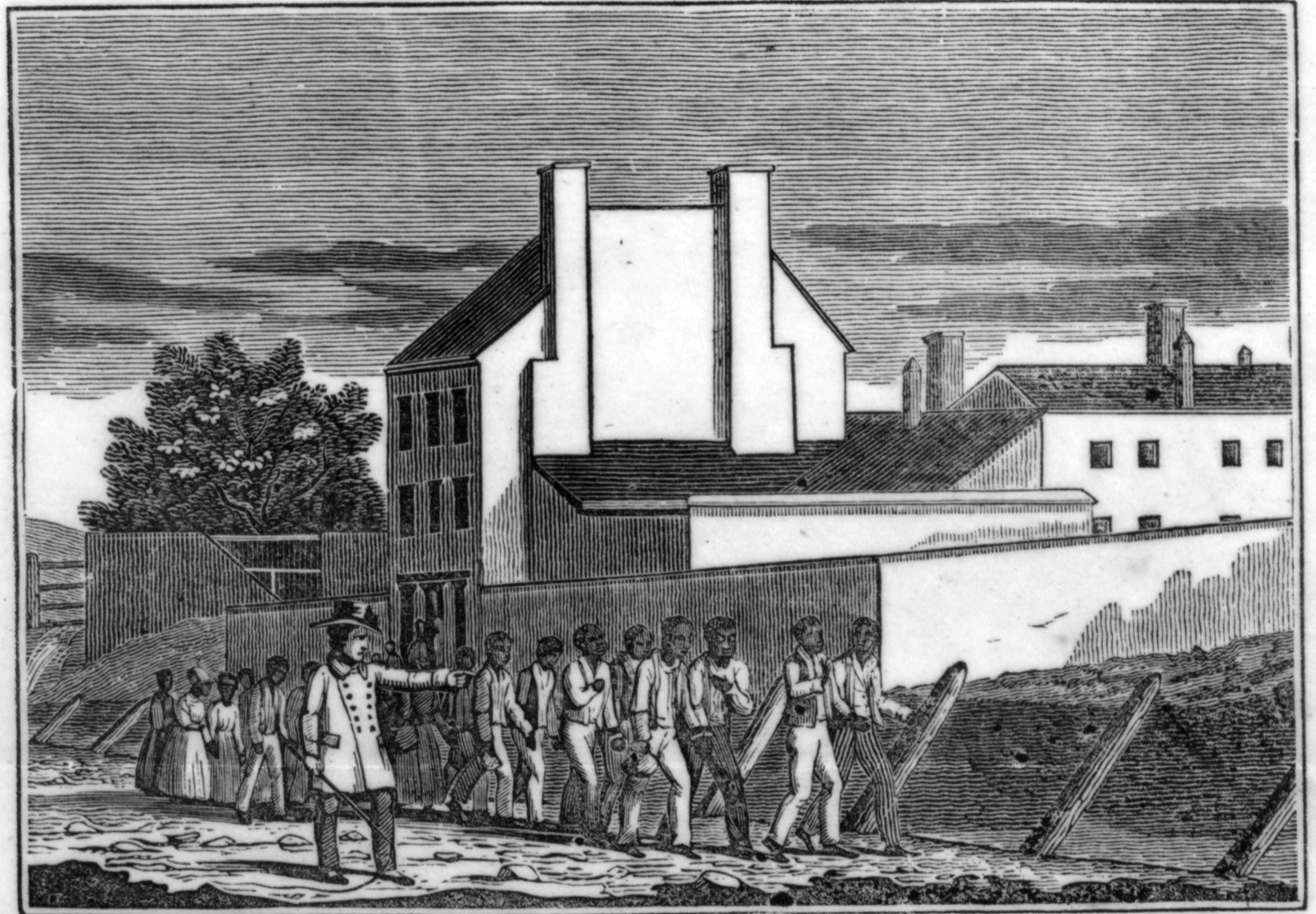
Slave prison in Alexandria, Virginia, ca. 1836

African workers first appeared in Virginia in 1619, brought by English privateers from a Spanish slave ship they had intercepted. As the Africans were baptized Christians, they were treated as indentured servants. Some laws regarding slavery of Africans were passed in the seventeenth century and codified into Virginia's first slave code in 1705. Slavery became illegal during the years of the American Civil War (1861–1865).

== Demographics ==
Exact numbers are difficult to obtain since human trafficking is illegal in Virginia. However, the National Human Trafficking Resource Center keeps statistics on the number of calls to their hotline and the number of cases. From December 2007 to June 2015, they received 2,803 calls on human trafficking in Virginia, which resulted in 628 cases. The most common type of trafficking was sex trafficking, domestic work and traveling sales crews.

== Laws in Virginia ==
Before April 1, 2015, Virginia was the only state in the nation that did not have any standalone human trafficking laws. SB 1188 and HB 1964 were passed on April 1, 2015. They were the first bills in Virginia to define sex trafficking, establish penalties, criminalized child sex trafficking as a Class 3 felony without the need to prove force, intimidation or deception, and criminalized recruitment for commercial sex. It also provides provisions for protecting and identifying sex trafficking victims. Robert Dillard was the first man charged under this law.

== Organizations based in Virginia ==
- Freedom 4/24 is an organization based in Lynchburg, Virginia. Its mission is to raise awareness of human trafficking of women and children around the world and to provide financial support to other anti-human trafficking organizations. It sponsors Frocks 4 Freedom, an event selling discounted trendy fashion, and Run 4 Their Lives, a 5K race, to raise money for their anti-human trafficking work.
- The Gray Haven is an organization based in Richmond, Virginia that focuses on helping victims of human trafficking. The operate a drop-in center for victims, have a crisis response team, offer case management, and has a court advocacy team. They work with local, state, and federal law enforcement to identify and provide service for victims.
- Northern Virginia Human Trafficking Initiative (NOVA HTI) is an organization based in Ashburn, Virginia that seeks to connect the community to fight human trafficking. It seeks to raise awareness, advocates for change in laws, and assist victims of human trafficking.
- Valley Human Trafficking Initiative (VHTI) is an organization based in Winchester, Virginia that provides awareness training to the community and assists victims of human trafficking.
