= Sorrow songs =

African Americans Slaves

Sorrow songs expressed the suffering and unjust treatment of enslaved African Americans during the period of slavery in the United States (1619–1865). The melodies and the lyrics conveyed sadness, and the words were "stunningly direct" about what it is to be enslaved. W. E. B. Du Bois coined the name.
