= Wilma King =

American historian

- Born: 1942 (age 83–84)
- Occupation: Historian

Wilma King (born 1942) is a historian and the Arvarh E. Strickland Distinguished Professor of History at the University of Missouri. She holds a B.A. in American history from Jackson State University, and both an M.A. and Ph.D. in Recent U.S. History from Indiana University. She came to the University of Missouri in 1999 and was the first to receive appointment to the Arvarh E. Strickland chair in Black History and Culture, established when Strickland retired.

== Selected bibliography ==
- Stolen Childhood: Slave Youth in Nineteenth-Century America (1995)
