= Henry Blair (inventor) =

American inventor (1807 – 1860)

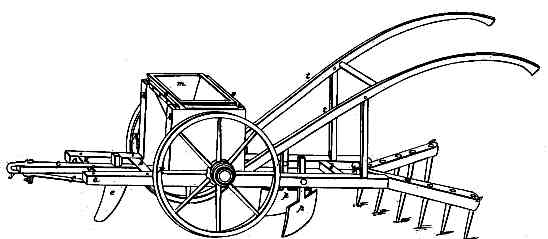
- The drawing of the Seed-Planter by Blair used on the patent application in 1836.
- Born: Henry Blaire c. 1807; Glen Ross, Maryland, United States
- Died: 1860
- Occupations: Inventor; Farmers
- Known for: The second African American to obtain a patent

Henry Blair (c. 1807–1860) was the second African American inventor to receive a US patent (after Thomas L. Jennings).

== Personal life ==
He was born in Glen Ross, Maryland, United States, in 1807. When he registered his first invention, Glenn-ross, Montgomery County, Maryland was given as his address. Blair died in 1860.

== Inventions ==
His first invention was a seed-planter, patented October 14, 1834, which allowed farmers to plant more corn using less labor.

On August 31, 1836, he obtained a second patent for a cotton planter. This worked by splitting the ground with two shovel-like blades which a horse pulled along. A wheel-driven cylinder followed, dropping the seed into the newly plowed ground. Blair had been a successful farmer for years and developed the inventions to increase efficiency in farming.

In the patent records, Blair is listed as a "colored man," making this identification the only one of its kind in early patent records. Blair signed his patents with an "x", suggesting he was illiterate. It is not known whether Blair was enslaved or free when he registered his patent. When his patents were granted, United States patent law allowed freed and enslaved people to obtain patents. In 1857, this law was challenged by an enslaver who claimed that he owned "all the fruits of the slave's labor," including their inventions. This resulted in a change of the law in 1858, which stated that enslaved people were not citizens and could not hold patents. In 1871, six years after the American Civil War ended, the law was changed to grant all men patent rights.
