= Transfer admissions in the United States =

Aspect of education

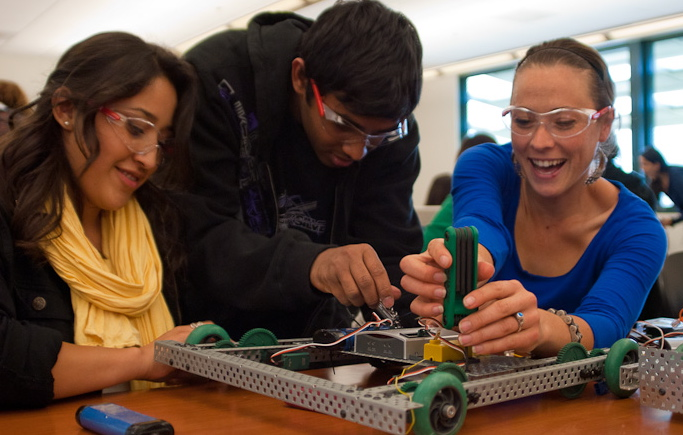
Community college students are being increasingly sought after by many colleges, particularly if they earn an associate degree, get high grades, and coordinate with counselors at their community college as well as Transfer Coordinators at their target school.

Transfer admissions in the United States refers to college students changing universities during their college years. While estimates of transfer activity vary considerably, the consensus view is that it is substantial and increasing, although media coverage of student transfers is generally less than coverage of the high school to college transition.

A common transfer path is students moving from two-year community colleges to four-year institutions, although there is also considerable movement between four-year institutions. Reasons for transferring include unhappiness with campus life, cost, and course and degree selection. There are no standardized rules nationwide for transfers, and requirements vary by college. However, many states have taken steps to make the transition easier and less problematic, particularly from community colleges to four-year schools within the state, by various methods including school-to-school credit arrangements called articulation agreements.

While many state universities are constrained by budget cuts which have sometimes lessened the number of spots open to transfer students, there are reports that many private colleges are becoming more assertive in seeking transfer applicants. Nevertheless, the transfer process can be difficult, such that transfer applicants have been described as collegiate "academic nomads" who face various obstacles trying to make sure their credits transfer properly to their new school. Unlike admission from high school directly to college, there is less data nationwide about transfer admissions, although there are signs that this is changing.

Advisors agree that much of the advice applicable to high school applicants to college is the same for transfer applicants, such as the need for visiting schools and trying to find one which is the "right fit". The admissions process for transfer students is somewhat different from that for high school seniors. Transfer applicants are more often evaluated by college grades, with standardized test results being less important. The statistical chance of being accepted into a college by a transfer arrangement was 64%, a figure slightly lower than the acceptance rate for first-year college students of 69%. Transferring into elite and highly selective schools is still quite difficult.

== Overview ==
=== Transfer pathways ===
The most common transfer pathway is from two-year community colleges to four-year colleges within a state. Students beginning their collegiate education at community colleges save "enormously" on tuition, since most live with their parents and many work full-time.

Think of us as the lowest-cost on ramp to an undergraduate degree ... Americans are pretty good at shopping price and value.

— Glenn DuBois of Virginia community colleges, 2010

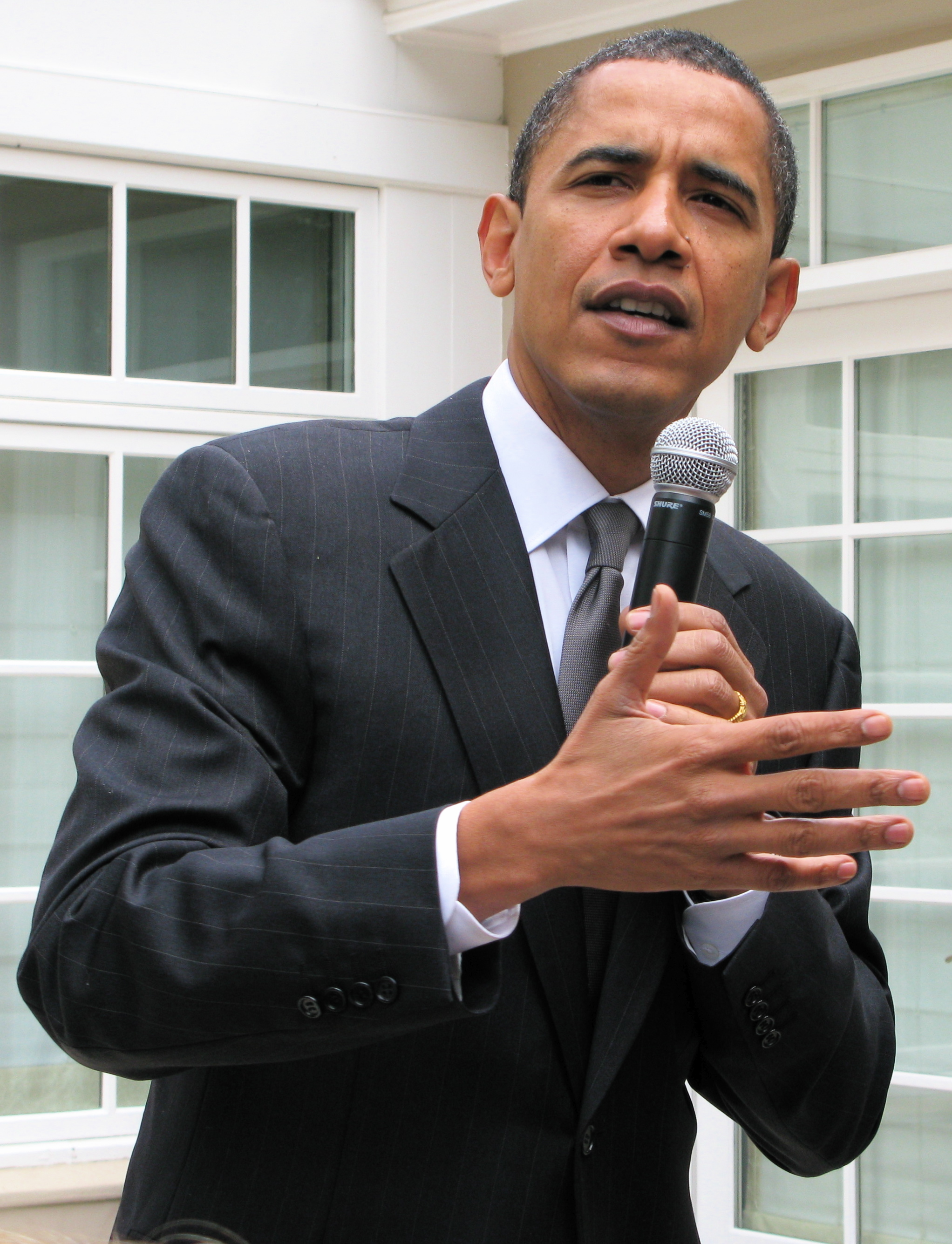
United States president Barack Obama, as a youth, transferred from one four-year college to another.

But there have been transfers occurring in the other direction, with students from private universities switching to state schools after two years, sometimes as a way to reduce cost. And many students switch between four-year colleges. Some students find themselves unhappy with their current college, and decide to switch for a variety of reasons, usually having to do with a program of study or a feeling about a particular school that the "fit" is not right, or concerns over cost. For example, United States President Barack Obama transferred from Occidental College to Columbia University during his college days.

=== Demographics of transfer students ===
Estimates vary considerably regarding how many college students transfer. Several reports suggested about a third of college-aged students had transferred at least once during their college careers, which includes transfers from community or two-year colleges to four-year colleges, as well as transfers between four-year colleges or universities. A high estimate was that 60% of students attended more than one collegiate institution between the ages of 18 and 24, and this estimate includes 20% who transferred from one four-year institution to another one. A third estimate was that only 20% of students in four-year colleges were transfer students. A fourth estimate, from the National Center of Education Statistics, was that 2.5 million college students transferred each year. In 2009, one report was that 566,400 students at schools surveyed by US News, transferred from one institution to another in that year. A report in 1999–2000 suggested that a fifth of community college students intended to transfer to four-year colleges, and an additional 24% were taking courses for personal enrichment or for transfer purposes. Another report suggested that only about a quarter of community college students followed through on their plan to transfer to a four-year college or university.

Transfer students tend to be disproportionately from poorer families, according to one report. A report suggests that many transfer students have "far more experience in the ups and downs of the working world" and tend to bring more diversity to a college campus. A second report confirms that "transfers graduate at a higher rate than students who just finished 12th grade", and have "adjusted to a more independent lifestyle." Demographic analysis suggests that a slight decline in high school graduates is underway since about 2009, prompting many four-year colleges to make up for the shortfall by bringing in more transfer students.

=== Financial considerations for transfer students ===
Transfer students can get financial assistance in the form of merit aid. One estimate was that over three-quarters of colleges (77%) offer merit aid to transfer applicants. Merit aid often varies by college size: smaller colleges with less than 3,000 students were somewhat more likely to offer merit aid (81%) than medium-sized colleges (66%) or large schools (67%). Greater than three-quarters of schools (77%) said that they offer merit scholarships for transfer students. And there are reports that the practice of offering "transfer scholarships" is becoming more prominent. There are reports that there is more financial aid for transfer students in states such as New Jersey, which have increased state funds for scholarships such as the NJ STARS II program. There was a report that less selective colleges and universities were somewhat less likely than competitive colleges to award merit scholarships to incoming transfer students.

== The process of transferring ==
=== Obstacles and difficulties ===
One reporter described the transfer process as problematic:

The trouble can begin during the clunky and overly complicated transfer admissions process. While students who come from community colleges are often assisted by long-standing agreements between a state's junior colleges and its flagship universities, the path for everyone else—those who are crossing state lines, who come from another four-year university, or who have spent years in the workforce—is far more treacherous. The process is difficult to navigate without the help of counselors and advisers, positions that often are left unfilled when budget cuts need to be made.

— Alison Go in US News, 2008

Openings for transfers vary by type of college, and can vary at a particular college year by year. One source suggested that small liberal arts colleges which have most freshmen completing all four years, tend to have few openings available; in contrast, large state universities often have many positions open, typically to accommodate graduates from two-year colleges. For example, 412 students applied for transfer admission into Amherst College and admitted about 6% of them; in contrast, the much larger Arizona State University had 11,427 transfer applicants and admitted 84% of them. One report described transfer students as "academic nomads" struggling to keep credit hours they have earned.

Transfer students, particularly community college students, face many additional obstacles when trying to achieve their transfer goals. While attending a community college is a financially attractive choice to numerous students in the United States, studies have shown that students who enroll in community colleges are significantly less likely to complete a bachelor's degree when compared to four-year students who started at a university as freshmen. In fact, it is estimated that only 20% of the 1992 high school class originally enrolled at a community college received a bachelor's degree by the year 2000. Students who have a strong sense of self-efficacy, and feeling of belonging to the campus community, are more likely to persist in their studies. However, transfer students' confidence can be hindered by the stigma associated with having attended community college, which is perceived to be less academically rigorous. Another factor preventing transfer out of community colleges is the requirement of remedial courses for new students. The large need for remedial classes, especially in writing and math, has left students discouraged, as they feel they are repeating high school. In addition, the lack of quality academic counseling has been a problem. Due to the fact that many community college students attend more than one college, proper advising has been hard to come by since each school has its each course numbering system. When a student wishes to transfer to an institution out of state, the process becomes even more complicated as there may be limited articulation agreements.

The obstacles preventing two-year college students from transferring and earning a bachelor's degree may also be related to motivational and psychological issues. While work, family, and financial issues are the common factors to blame for the decline in transfer rates from community college students, research has shown that motivation to learn and succeed can make a major impact on a student's future. After examining the results from National Longitudinal Surveys, it was discovered that students entering a community college who aimed during their last few years in high school to earn a B.A. or graduate degree yielded the highest transfer rates in 1972 and 1980, the two classes of the study. While the transfer rates in this study declined, a correlation between positive educational aspirations and transfer success was noted. Additional studies have also examined the relationship of psychological and motivational factors with transfer rates. Students who have ambitious career goals are more likely to transfer, and students whose expectations don't exceed the two-year college level are less likely to transfer. Making significant progress and steps at a community college may also be a beneficial factor in maintaining motivation and overcoming the difficulties that transfer students face. Referring back to the results from the National Longitudinal Surveys, it was found that students who transferred without an associate degree were less likely to complete a B.A. degree than those without one.

=== Researching transfer options ===
Only in the past decade has the federal government begun requiring colleges to post statistics about transfer students. As a result, there is not much readily-accessible information about historical trends about transfer students. The United States Department of Education did a tracking study in 2003 to analyze the progress of students who started at community colleges in that year, and found that of those planning to transfer to a four-year college, only 15% of them had actually done so within a three-year time interval. Record keeping and data about transfer admissions is not as complete as comparable data for freshman admissions; it varies by school. Researching transfer possibilities is generally more complex than applying to college from high school. Advisors suggest one method to get information about specific schools is to search online and use the Common Data Set:

The Common Data Set is a document that four-year schools across the country complete that contains lots of information on such topics as admission criteria, freshman academic profile, campus safety and transfer admissions. You can often find a college's Common Data Set by Googling that term and the name of the institution.

— Lynn O'Shaughnessy in US News, 2010

So-called "transfer friendly" colleges which seek transfer applicants often have a transfer coordinator, housing arrangements for transfer students, an orientation program for transfer students, and are likely to accept most or all of a student's credits from their previous college.

=== Transferring credits ===
Generally in the past, the uncertainty surrounding the issue of credit transfers has been a continuing headache for transfer applicants. An applicant might find out, belatedly, that coursework taken at one school would not be accepted at a second school. A general issue with transferring colleges is getting the new college to accept the coursework from the old one. Students often speak with the target college's transfer credit evaluator to get a sense of which credits will be accepted. In past years, the willingness of target colleges to approve credits was described as a "thorny proposition". The issue of transferring credits could be further complicated if an incoming school decided that a specific grade in the former school was insufficient for credit or if a transfer student decided to switch majors. There have been stories of students who arrived on campus with worthless transcripts:

There's nothing more frustrating for a transfer student than to sit down with a four-year school and realize they wasted two years because they didn't take the right classes.

— Alan Byrd, admissions director at University of Missouri–St. Louis, 2012

A reporter explained that community colleges do not have articulation agreements with every possible target school, and that course catalogs can not provide information about which courses will be accepted at which colleges:

Course catalogs offer little or no guidance to students, why one class might transfer and the other won't. But that's because each four-year school may treat a particular class differently. The University of Missouri might accept an English course rejected by the University of Kansas. There can even be differences within a campus, with a science course counting toward a general education degree but failing to satisfy a school's nursing program. As a result, it's not always clear whether a course will be accepted when a student decides to transfer.

— Reporter Tim Barker in St. Louis Today, 2012

Despite past difficulties with transferring credits, there are numerous reports that colleges are seeking more transfer applicants. To expedite this process, many colleges are taking steps to streamline the credit-approval process and are being more open-minded about accepting credits. Some colleges have "one-stop transfer centers" to make final determinations about which course credits will transfer. The American Association of Collegiate Registrars and Admissions Officers oversees colleges and universities and determines such matters as college accreditation, and as a result, most four-year colleges accept credits from colleges that this body approves provided that the student has earned a grade of "C" or higher in those courses. One advisor suggested that students should "get in touch with their target schools as early as possible to make sure their course plan will work." Another successful transfer strategy is for students to complete their Associate Degree which, according to one report, will "essentially guarantee that all of their credits will transfer."

=== Statistics on acceptances ===
Statistics regarding transfer admissions are becoming easier to obtain since most schools follow the Common Data Set format and post information on numerous variables on a website. However, formats vary: some schools use a spreadsheet while others use a pdf. And in some cases, the common data set information is hard to find on a college's website, or buried in a "Fast Facts" section. The data in the adjacent table is for selected colleges for the 2010–2011 year. It is average data only, and may change substantially from year to year, and from college to college. Click on the triangles to sort columns by school name, state, number of applicants, and percent acceptances.

Transfer admissions statistics for selected colleges selected years Source: Common Data Set Click triangles to sort
| School | St | Type | Applied # | Admit % | Year |
|---|---|---|---|---|---|
| Arizona State | AZ | Public | 7428 | 79 | 2015 |
| Cornell | NY | Private | 4117 | 19 | 2015 |
| TCNJ | NJ | Public | 1045 | 73 | 2012 |
| Boston University | MA | Private | 3594 | 40 | 2015 |
| UC Berkeley | CA | Public | 16620 | 20 | 2014 |
| Wesleyan University | CT | Private | 460 | 30 | 2013 |
| DePaul | IL | Private | 5182 | 60 | 2015 |
| Carnegie-Mellon | PA | Private | 800 | 8 | 2014 |
| Rutgers University | NJ | Public | 16556 | 56 | 2014 |
| U. Minnesota | MN | Public | 9005 | 36 | 2015 |
| U. Florida | FL | Public | 5996 | 41 | 2012 |
| U. Delaware | DE | Private | 1231 | 58 | 2014 |
| Bucknell | PA | Private | 207 | 23 | 2015 |
| Haverford | PA | Private | 134 | 6 | 2014 |
| Lehigh | PA | Private | 583 | 15 | 2015 |
| Stanford | CA | Private | 1764 | 2 | 2014 |
| U. Michigan | MI | Public | 3605 | 36 | 2015 |
| U. Texas-Austin | TX | Public | 8449 | 40 | 2013 |
| Pomona | CA | Private | 356 | 6 | 2015 |
| Bates College | ME | Private | 154 | 4 | 2015 |
| Rice | TX | Private | 431 | 12 | 2014 |
| Notre Dame | IN | Private | 559 | 27 | 2014 |
| Purdue | IN | Public | 3300 | 44 | 2011 |
| SUNY-Binghamton | NY | Public | 4591 | 49 | 2013 |
| Reed | OR | Private | 286 | 30 | 2015 |
| Swarthmore | PA | Private | 212 | 8 | 2015 |
| Harvard | MA | Private | 1432 | 1 | 2013 |
| U. Arkansas | AR | Public | 3755 | 63 | 2015 |
| BYU | NV | Private | 2367 | 41 | 2013 |
| U. Oklahoma | OK | Public | 3271 | 68 | 2015 |
| Colgate | NY | Private | 308 | 18 | 2015 |

=== Applications considerations ===
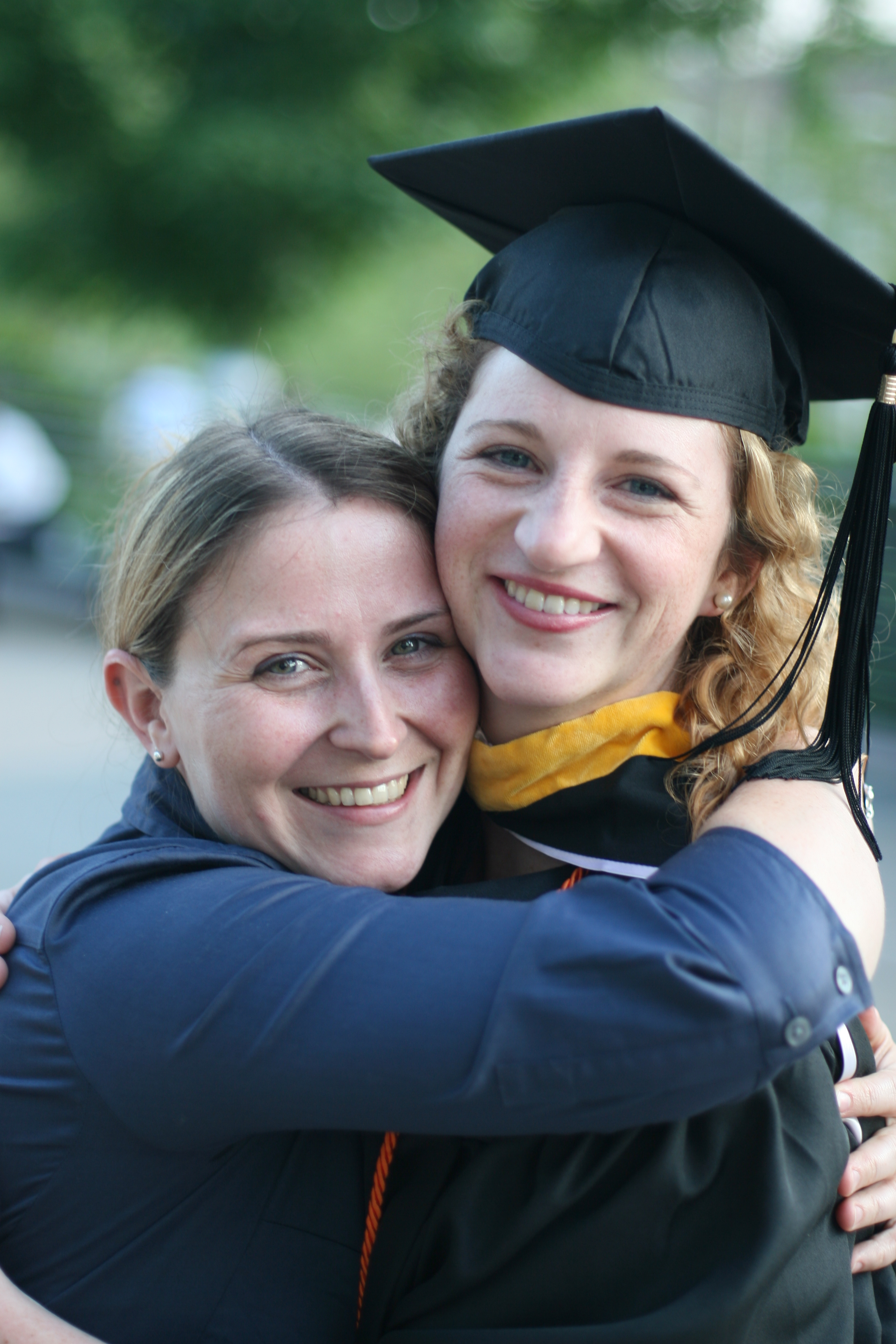
Several reports suggest that community college applicants who transfer to four-year colleges become successful academically since they often have excellent work skills.

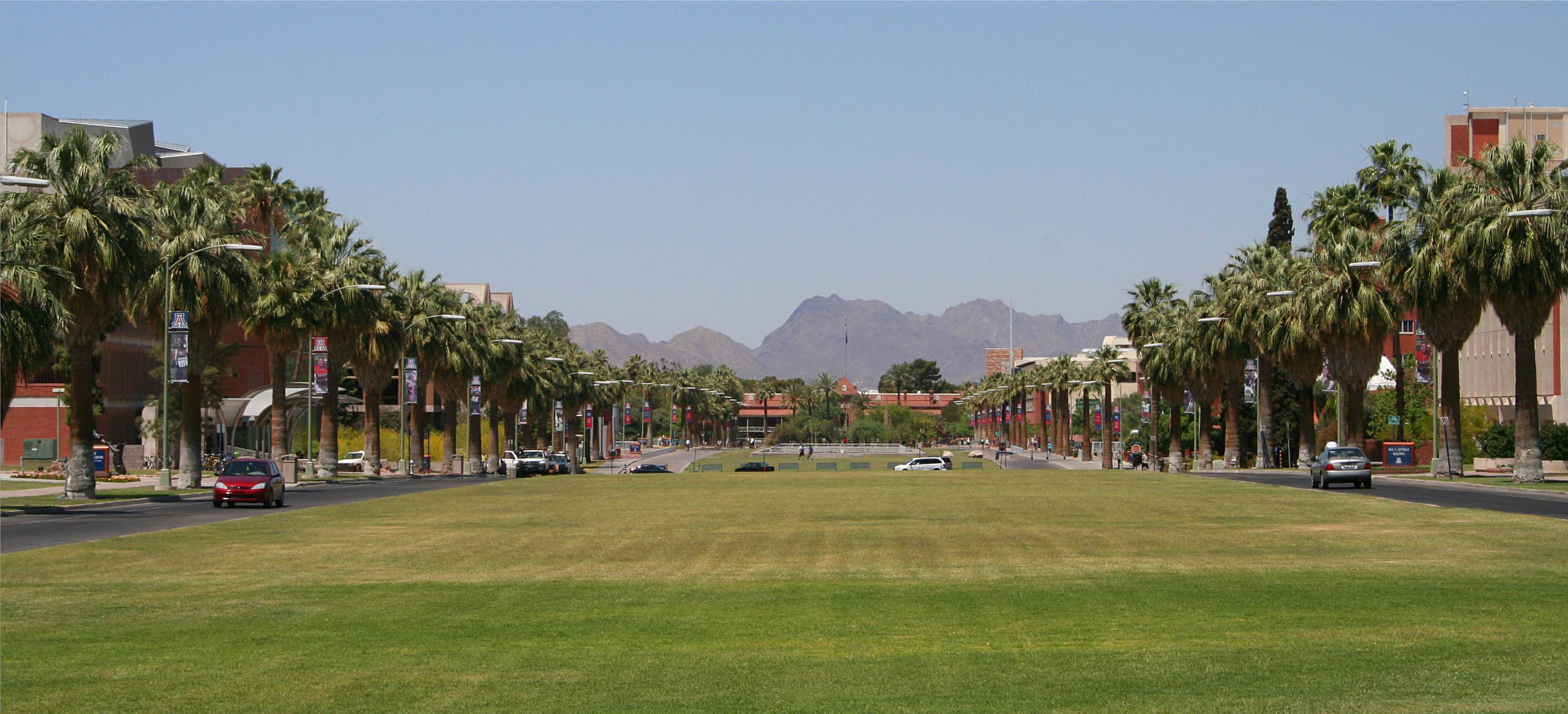
The University of Arizona accepts the largest number of incoming transfer students, according to one report.

Most university admissions offices have an official with the designated responsibility for handling transfer admissions. Transfer students have been counselled to contact the target college's "transfer coordinator" or "transfer officer".

Admissions departments, when evaluating transfer applicants, weigh the student's grade point average at their current college to a considerable extent; it is usually the single most important factor overall. One estimate was that 90% of colleges surveyed felt that the college grade point average was "considerably important." A second source confirms that post-secondary grade point average is the "most important factor for transfer admission." Other factors entering into transfer evaluations may include high school grade point average (56% of colleges consider this), recommendations and quality of current college or university programs (48%), essays or writing samples (47%), and scores on standardized tests (42%). As a rule of thumb, the more time that a student has spent with his or her current college, the less another school will be interested in standardized tests taken during high school such as the ACT test or SAT test. Students who completed two-years at a community college and earned an Associate Degree often will not be asked to supply a high school record or ACT/SAT scores unless they earned less than 30 credits. About a tenth of colleges (11%) consider it a negative if the transfer applicant planned to only attend the new school "part-time".

Transfer students are usually asked to explain why they would like to transfer, particularly when changing from one four-year college to another. One report advised applicants to avoid saying anything negative about their current school but rather to focus on specific reasons for the change.

Admissions consultants Howard and Matthew Greene suggested that students should contact target schools early:

... if you have particular universities in mind as targets, start contacting them early to know their time schedule and particular requirements in the first two years of their program so that you can try to match up your curriculum. Be certain of specific requirements for any special school programs (business, communications, fine arts, engineering, etc.). The transfer process is typically more mature and directed, and students should have a better sense of their interests, majors, and what they're looking for. Colleges expect direct contacts from students as mature learners.

— Howard and Matthew Greene, 2003

Percent agreement by colleges of statements regarding transfer admissions
| Statement | % Agree |
|---|---|
| High school grade point average is important | 56% |
| Quality of current school is important | 48% |
| Essay or writing sample is important | 47% |
| Standardized test scores are important | 42% |
| It is a negative if a transfer applicant only wants to enroll part-time | 11% |
| It is a negative if a transfer applicant plans to transfer 60+ credit hours | 6% |
| It is a negative if a transfer applicant earned a GED certificate | 6% |
| It is a positive if a transfer applicant is attending a highly competitive college | 50% |
| It is a positive if a transfer applicant earns an associate degree | 40% |
| Colleges use statistical algorithms to recalculate an applicant's current college GPA | 43% |
| College provides merit scholarships for transfer students | 77% |
| ..source: NACAC survey via Washington Post | |

=== Adjusting to a new school ===
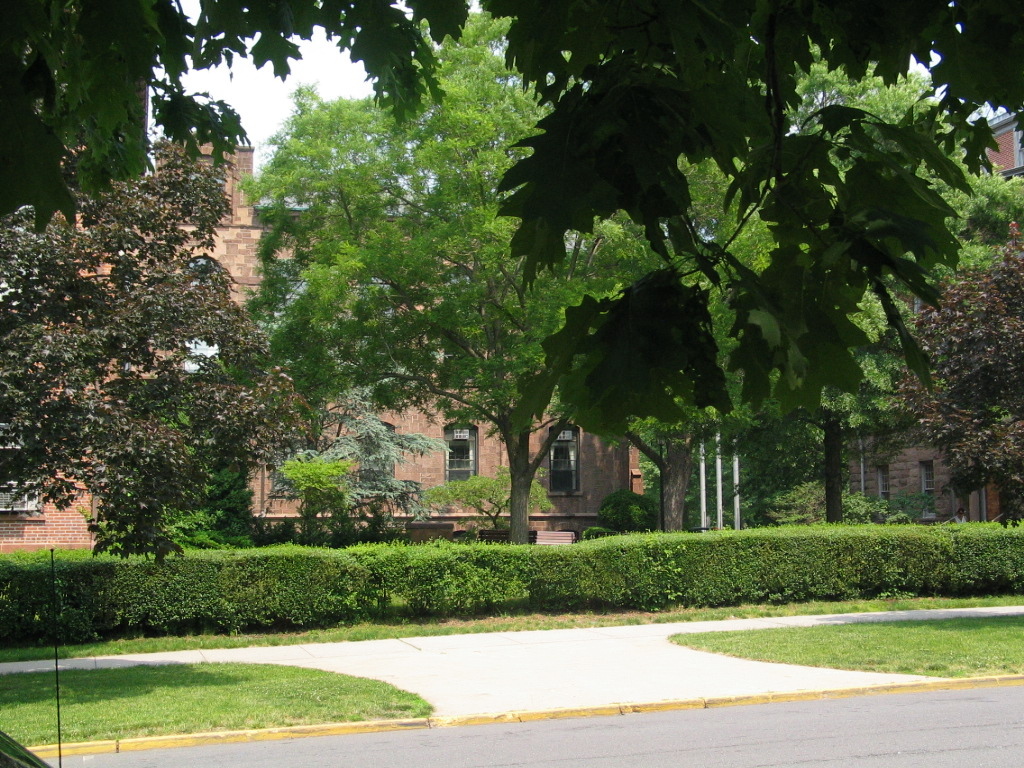
Rutgers University in New Jersey has a one-credit required "course" to teach incoming transfer students about the particulars of campus life at the public university.

Transfer applicants sometimes have difficulty adjusting to a new school. Unlike four-year students, they often have to get acclimated to the institution at a time when they are expected to make decisions about majors and courses of study, and often have to learn new procedures and routines. In addition to reduced housing options, other difficulties encountered include often having to register for courses after four-year students, so many courses are filled up before a transfer student has a chance to sign up for them. Some universities such as Rutgers University in New Jersey have a required one-credit seminar "course" to teach incoming transfer students about university life, including topics ranging from football games to art museums, and has 25 "transfer mentor" students to help them adjust to campus life.

== Transferring to different types of schools ==
=== Transferring to a private college ===
There are reports of private colleges making more active efforts to woo community college students as an effort to "bolster and diversify their enrollments". Private college admissions departments are more likely to evaluate transfer applicants based on nonacademic variables such as the interview, recommendations, writing samples, and the quality of the applicant's current college. One estimate was that 40% of these schools recalculate a transfer applicant's GPA as part of the evaluation process, by using algorithms to factor in perceived course difficulty and comprehensiveness. One report suggested that private schools, while they tend to be more expensive, were a "strong option for transfer students" since they were often unaffected by state budget cuts and tend to have "better counseling services." Private colleges often view applicants from community colleges positively since many have had a track record of finishing their four-year degrees, or what colleges term "high persistence", and being successful students with relatively high graduation rates. There are reports that the percentage of community college students who are transferring to private schools is increasing; in the past, the percentage was about 15% to 20%, but the figure is more likely to be higher in recent years.

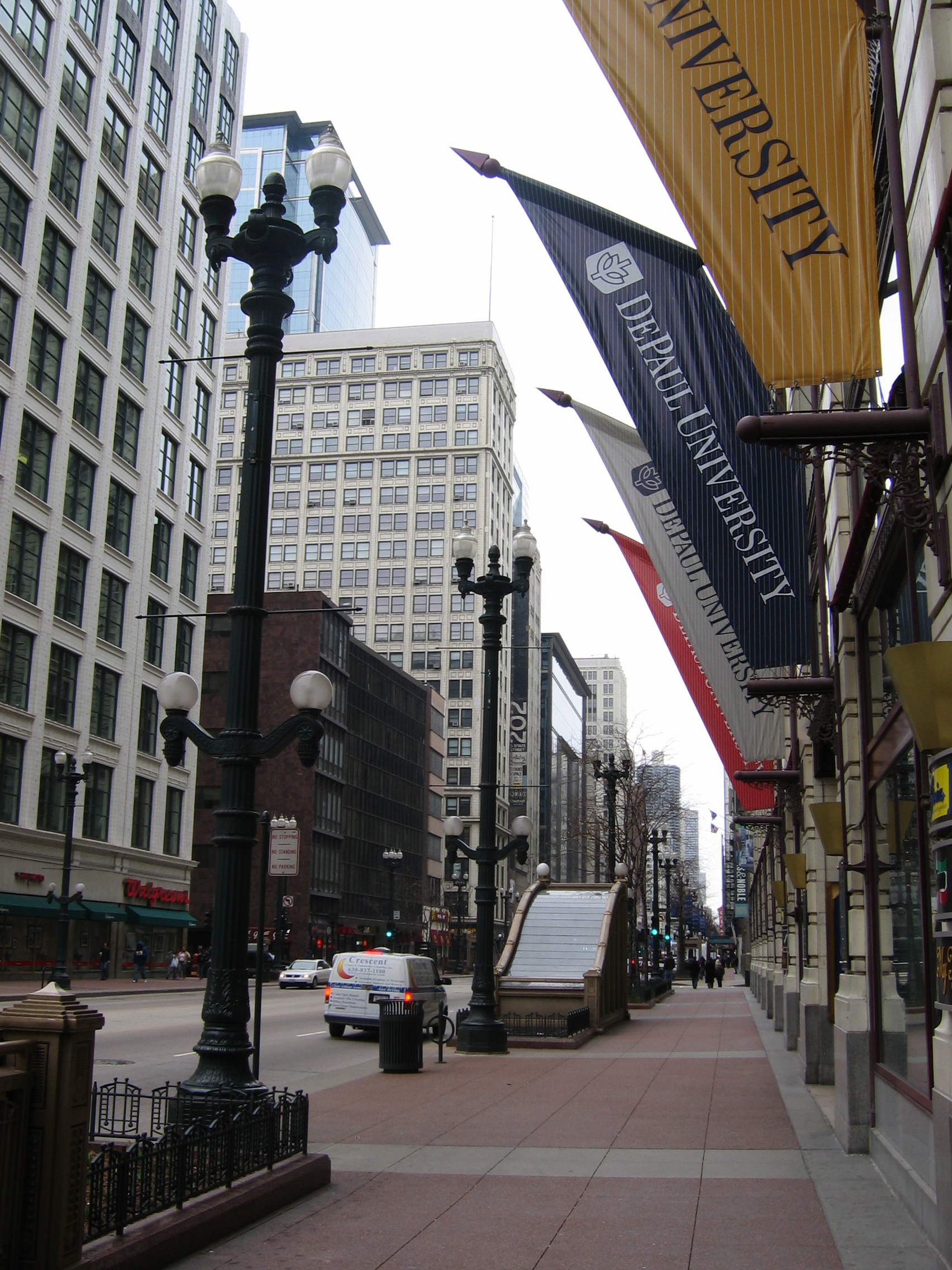
Chicago's DePaul University accepts many incoming students from community colleges.

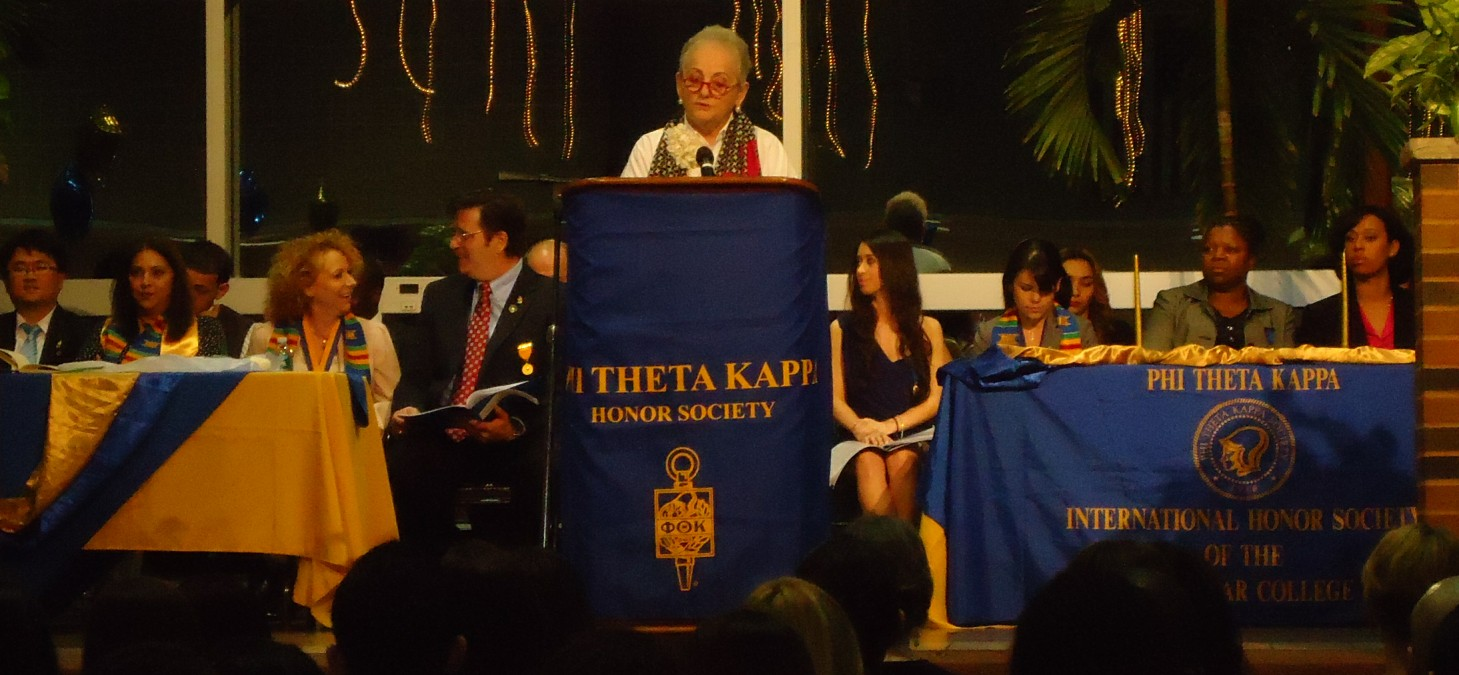
Two-year college students who belong to the academic honor society Phi Theta Kappa have excellent opportunities to transfer to many types of schools.

There tend to be more transfers to large private institutions, such as DePaul University in Chicago which accepted 1,400 transfer students in 2009, mostly from community colleges. In New Jersey, Seton Hall University keeps track of high school students which it accepts but who then decide to enroll in a community college, and then it sends them letters and emails after a year to try to get them to transfer; in addition, Seton Hall purchases lists of students from Phi Theta Kappa, the two-year college honor society.

=== Transferring to a public university ===
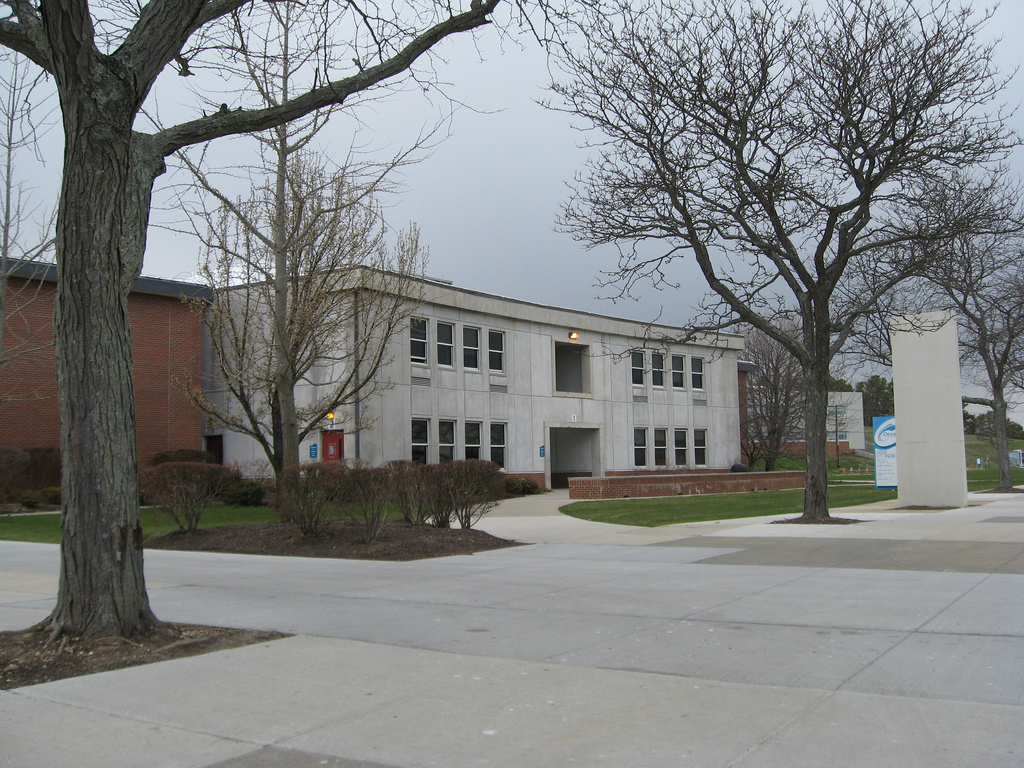
Community colleges such as Ocean County College in New Jersey often have clearly specified transfer pathways to four-year colleges within the state.

This is the most likely pathway for students transferring from community colleges, usually to a four-year public university within their state. About half of public universities recalculate a transfer applicant's GPA when deciding whether to admit the student. Often large public universities are well-suited to absorb many transfer applicants.

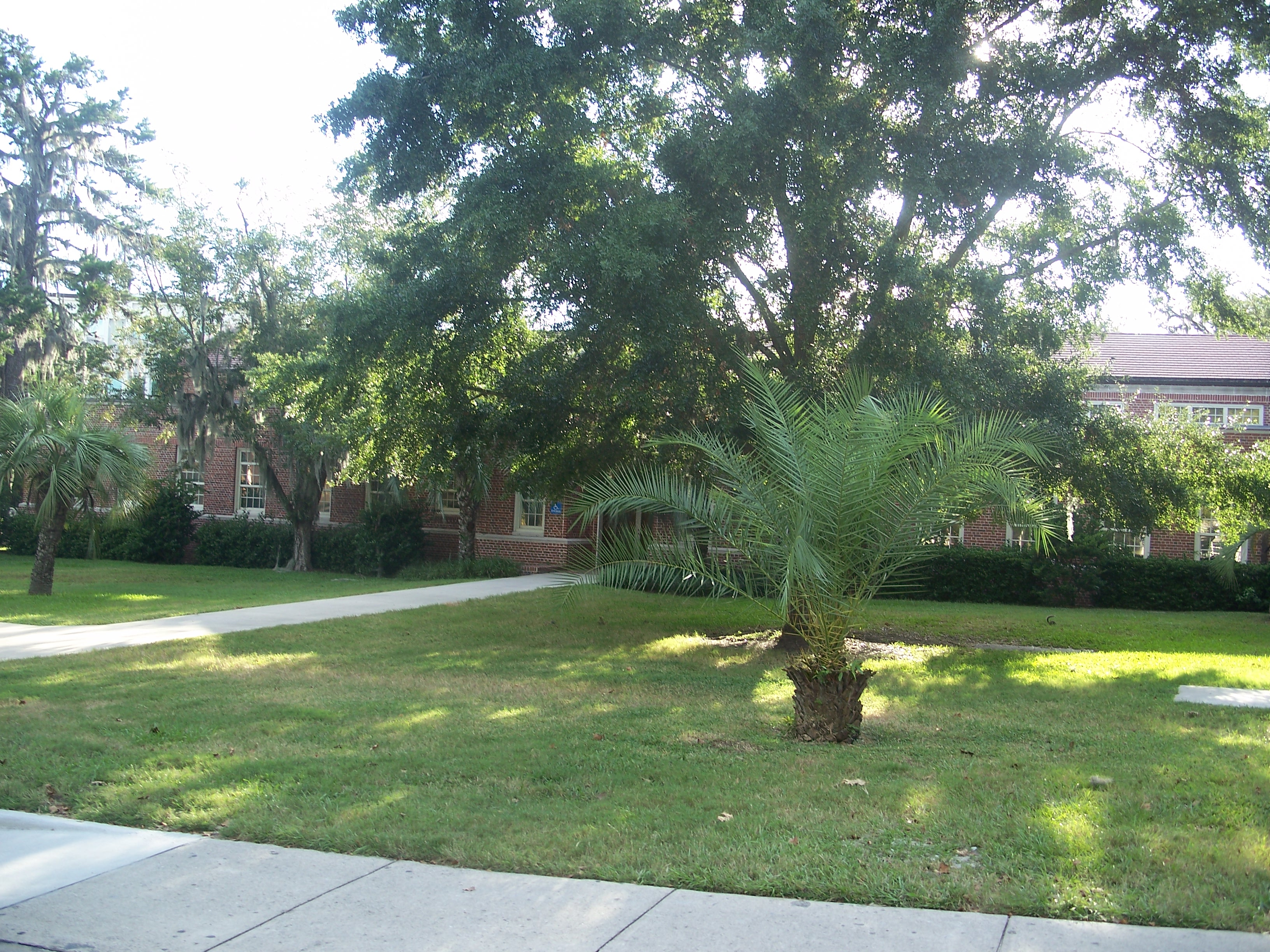
Budget cuts at the University of Florida have left fewer spots open for transfer students.

However, there are numerous reports from states about constraints placed on incoming transfers because of budget cuts, although the general pattern is that states are working harder to ensure a smoother transition, with transfers of credit, from community colleges to four-year flagship schools. In Virginia, the University of Virginia, which has approximately 14,000 undergraduate students, had 2,434 transfer applications in 2008, and of these, admitted 958, an acceptance rate of 39%. In 2008 in Florida, the University of Florida announced reductions in its transfer class by 33% to cope with budget shortfalls. The picture is similar in Minnesota, with a report that the University of Minnesota is planning to decrease the number of transfer applicants by 8%, meaning that 300 fewer students will be able to transfer into the state's flagship college, although there is a conflicting report suggesting that enrollment at the state's university is increasing. At Maryland's Bowie State University, transfer applicants apply online, pay a fee of $40, ask their current college to send official transcripts of their coursework, and require a minimum of 24 transferable credits with a minimum grade point average of 2.0. Bowie considers applicants from two-year colleges differently from applicants elsewhere; two-year applicants can transfer a maximum of 65 credit hours, while applicants from four-year colleges can transfer a maximum of 90 credit hours. Applicants with fewer than 24 transferable credits must meet the requirements for freshman admission, which includes having their high school transcript and SAT/ACT scores sent. Large "well-endowed" private universities such as the University of Southern California and New York University have "ratcheted up" efforts to recruit community college transfers to help them improve their "demographic mix":

It helps the selective privates with their diversity, in terms of race and socioeconomic status ... To get students in certain income brackets, it matters. Oftentimes it's easier to recruit at community colleges than at challenged high schools. For those who value diversity, whether it's because of the college rankings or their mission, this is where you go.

— Sociologist Josipa Roksa of the University of Virginia.

=== Transferring to an elite university ===
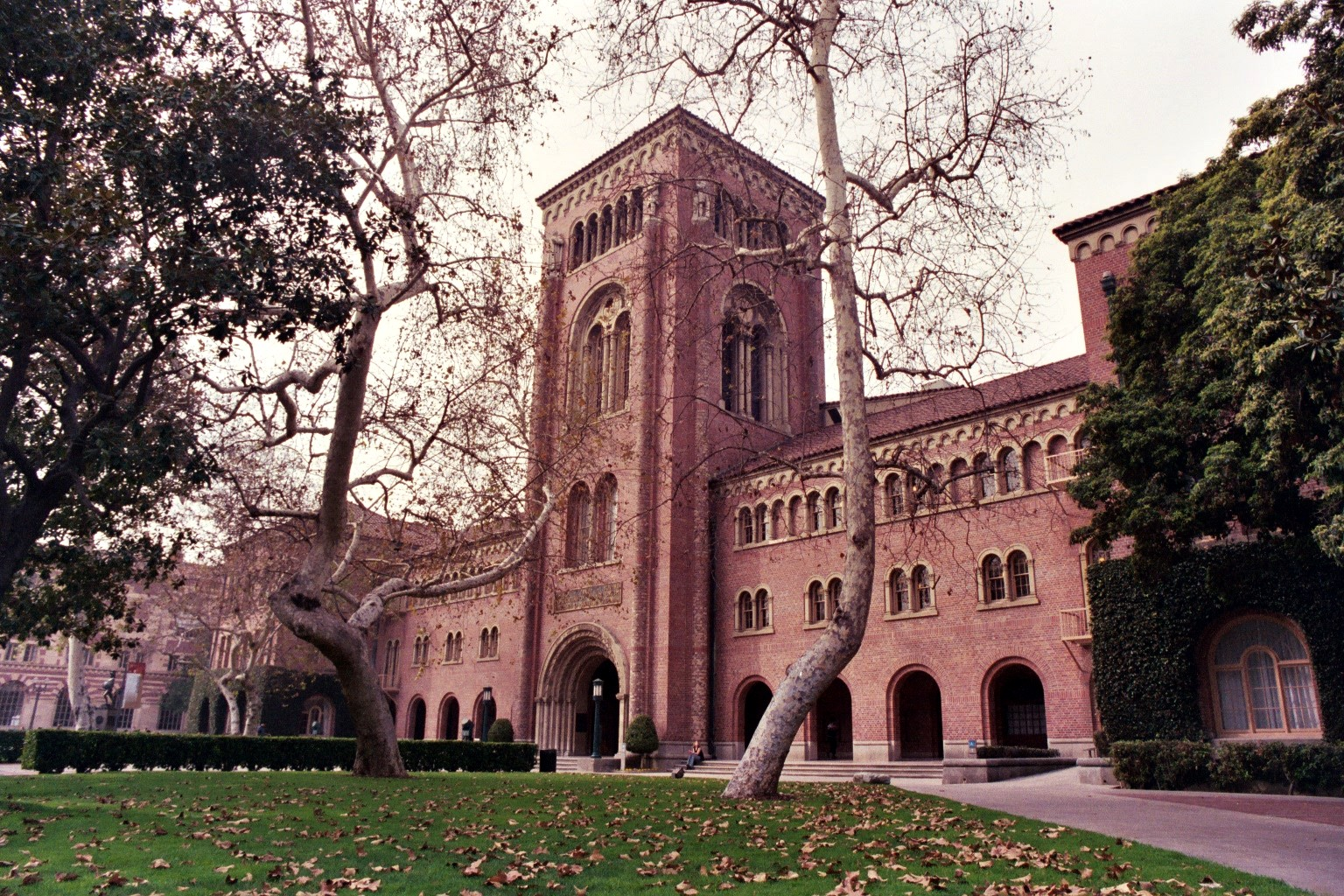
Well-endowed large private universities such as the University of Southern California have ramped up efforts to attract transfer students, according to one report.

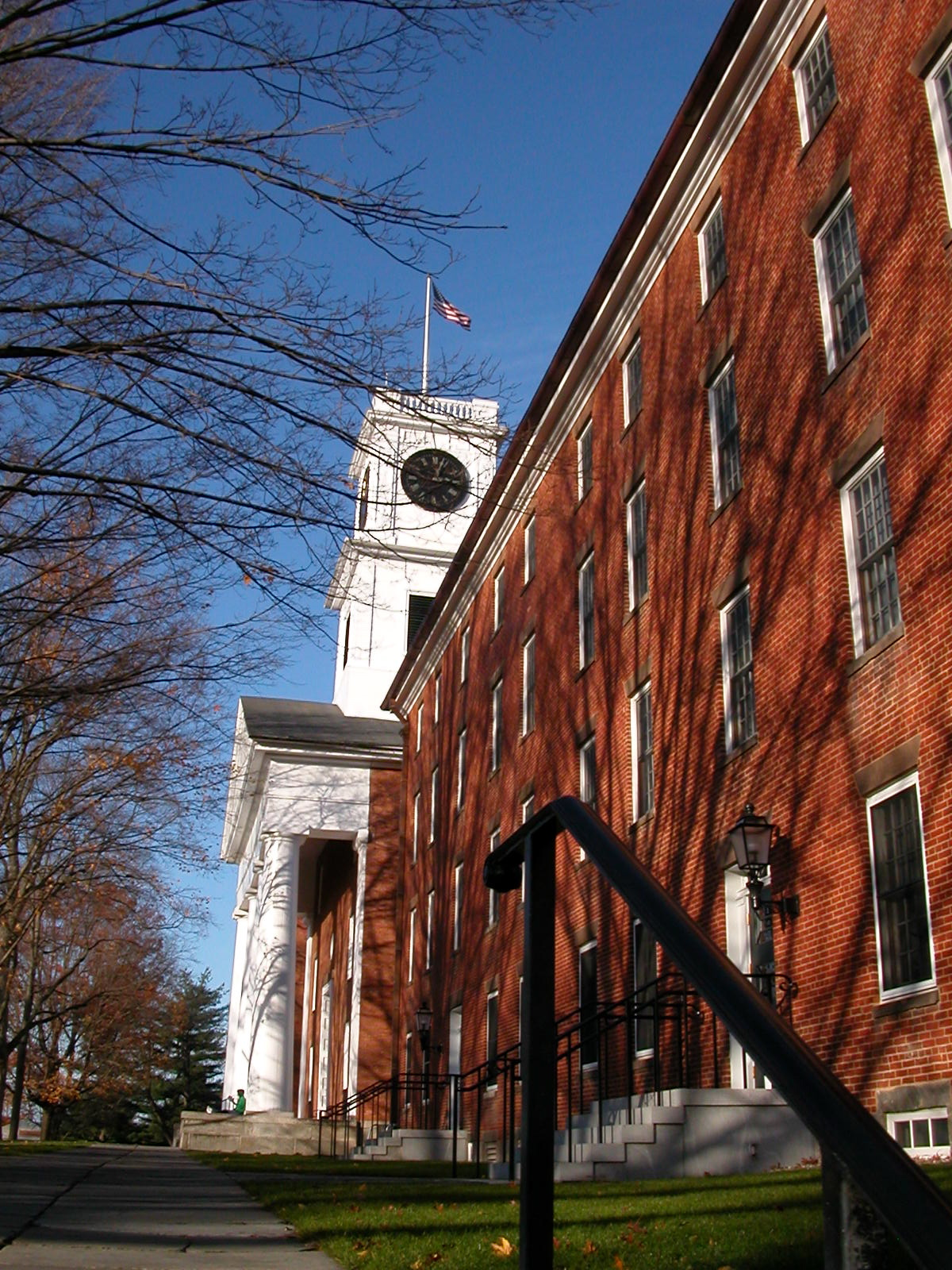
Amherst College accepts very few transfer applicants.

A general picture is that elite colleges and universities accept very few transfer applications and are "extremely picky", generally because most of their enrolled students continue through all four years without changing to another school or dropping out, and there are few empty slots to fill. For example, Yale University had 751 transfer applications in 2008, and accepted only 24 of these. Harvard University has not accepted any transfer students in the last few years; Columbia accepted only 8% in 2007, and the University of Pennsylvania accepted only 16% in 2008. These schools are more likely to consider such factors as the quality of the applicant's high school and current college, as well as factors such as the applicant's state and county of residence, race and ethnicity, and alumni relations. One report suggested the essay was highly important, and that an applicant should explain why they wished to change schools. Generally, elite schools do not look favorably on students who try to "trade up" to a more "prestigious bumper sticker." Successful transfers into elite schools have "great grades and test scores," and students usually transfer from other elite schools. Some top schools such as Cornell University have articulation agreements specifying how a community college student can transfer into Cornell by taking specific courses and getting good grades in them.

=== Transferring within a state ===
The consensus view is that transferring from a two-year college to a four-year college—within one state—is smoother than transfers from one state to another. Since community and two-year college programs are often supported by government subsidies at the county or state level, and lawmakers strive to increase educational opportunities for students within their state, there have been many efforts by state legislatures and administrators in flagship universities to facilitate the switch-over from two-year to four-year colleges within each state. In addition, many state colleges standardize their requirements for incoming transfer students, which helps to expedite intrastate transfers.

Arizona State University (ASU) in Tempe, Arizona offers tools such as the Transfer Guide to aid students in planning their course-by-course path toward transfer and degree progression. According to ASU, the Transfer Guide (available at the ASU Transfer Guide portal) evaluates hundreds of thousands of courses and allows students to build personalized pathways into most ASU majors. transferguide.apps.asu.edu. ASU maintains formal partnerships with all Maricopa County Community Colleges, as well as with the state's public universities: the University of Arizona and Northern Arizona University.

Another example is the California State University system gives priority to community college students transferring to four-year colleges within California; one estimate was that 60% of students on its 23 different campuses were transfer students. The University of California has an arrangement to accept many students conditionally to one of its 10 undergraduate campuses if students first complete two years of community college; the plan extended these so-called "provisional offers of admission" to 12,700 students in the year 2000 (before the tenth campus opened). In 2010, there were reports that 33,700 students were trying to transfer into the University of California system, but that uncertain state funding issues were complicating matters. A report in 2012 suggested that "explosive growth in the number of applications" along with cuts in state funding had prevented the University of California, San Diego from continuing their Transfer Admission Guarantee program.

Generally, large state universities are well-suited to offer higher education to transfer applicants from within their state as well as elsewhere. The largest state university to enroll transfer students was Arizona State University, according to one report, which enrolled 5,388 transfer students in 2009. Many two-year community or county colleges have longstanding articulation agreements with the flagship universities within their states about accepting transfer applicants. Indiana has been successful in shunting students from its Ivy Tech community colleges to its four-year colleges and that successful transfers, including transfers of credits, has risen 438 percent during the past ten years. There are reports that states such as Virginia and Maryland have made efforts to build a "transfer pipeline" from community colleges to public universities to the extent that it was "changing the traditional path to a four-year degree." Virginia has a system in which students at any of its 23 community colleges who earn an associate degree have a "guaranteed transfer" to one of the state's highly ranked colleges and universities such as Virginia Commonwealth University in Richmond. Maryland has an online database so that community college students can know the transfer value of each course. In tight economic times, the path of a relatively inexpensive two-year community college followed by a somewhat more expensive two years at a four-year public university, is often a more realistic choice for cash-strapped families. Frostburg State University has worked on agreements with community colleges to make the transfer between the two schools "smoother". Minnesota, as well, has outlined its policy of "transfer rights and responsibilities" to smooth the transition. The policy insists students have a right to "clear, accurate and current information" about transfer policies including deadline, requirements for degrees, and course equivalencies, while at the same time insisting that students have a duty to enroll in transfer workshops, speak with advisors, and plan out their path towards degrees. In New Jersey, there were reports of many residents transferring to in-state schools in "record numbers" in 2009, and that many transfer students were considered to be "prize catches" since they had developed a track record of educational achievement at other schools in neighboring states and around the country. New Jersey's 19 community colleges serve approximately 400,000 students, and 61% of them transfer to four-year schools.

=== International transfers ===
It is possible to transfer to many US universities from universities in other countries. According to the US-UK Fulbright Commission, it is up to the university departments to which the student transfers to decide how much credit courses completed at the previous university are worth.

== See also ==
- College admissions in the United States
- University and college admission
- FAFSA
