= College tour =

College event for prospective students

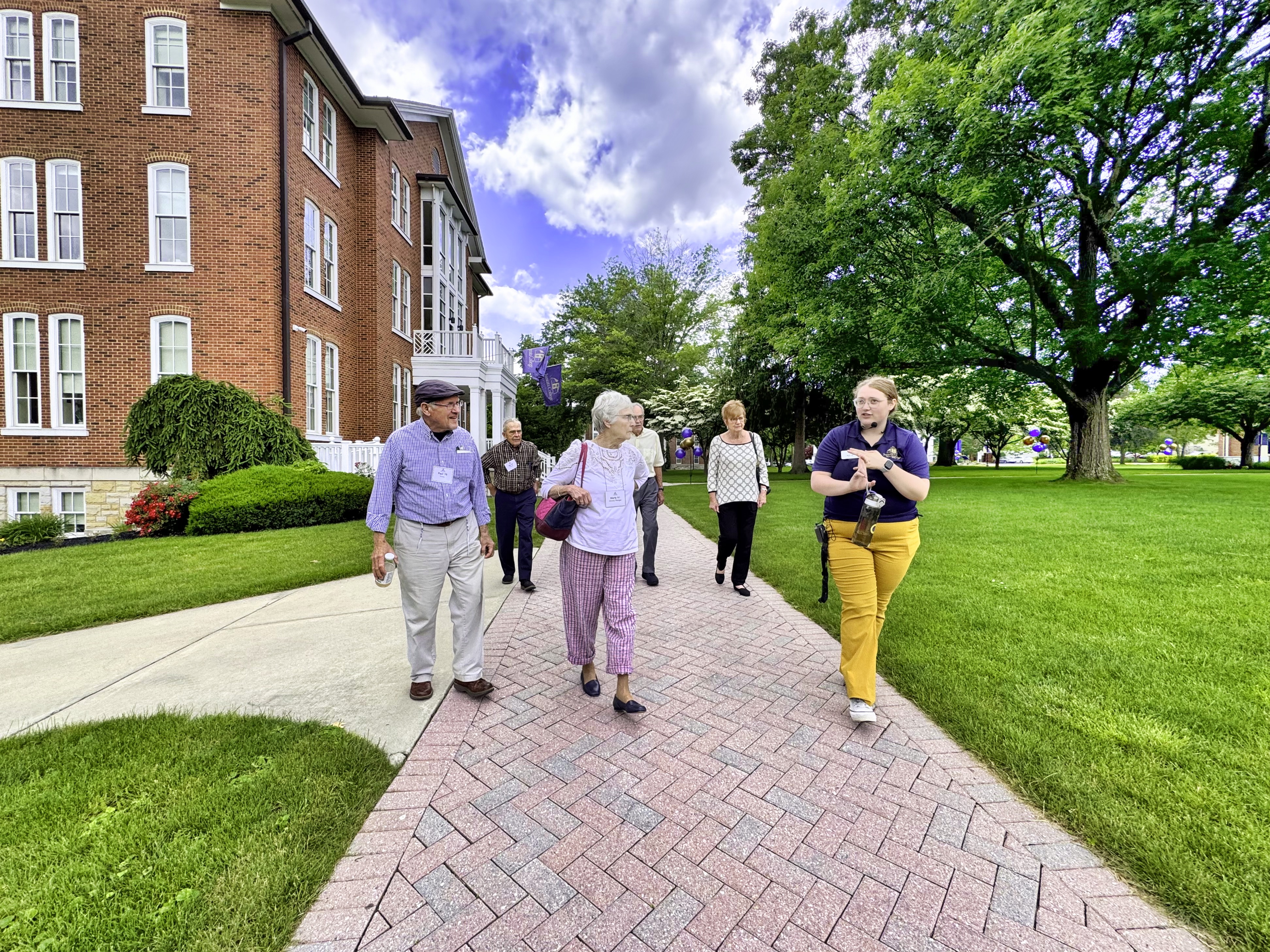
A Juniata College student takes alumni on an official campus tour

A college tour, also called a campus tour, is a tour of a college or university's campus. Prospective students, their family members and other visitors take campus tours to learn about the college or university's facilities, as well as student life, culture on campus, academics, and programs offered by the institution. During these tours, prospective students are able to learn about the built environment and the overall look and feel of the institution. College tours may be taken individually or by school groups and educational programs as a way for many people to visit several schools over a short period of time. In addition, many colleges now offer virtual tours on the Internet.

== Campus visit ==
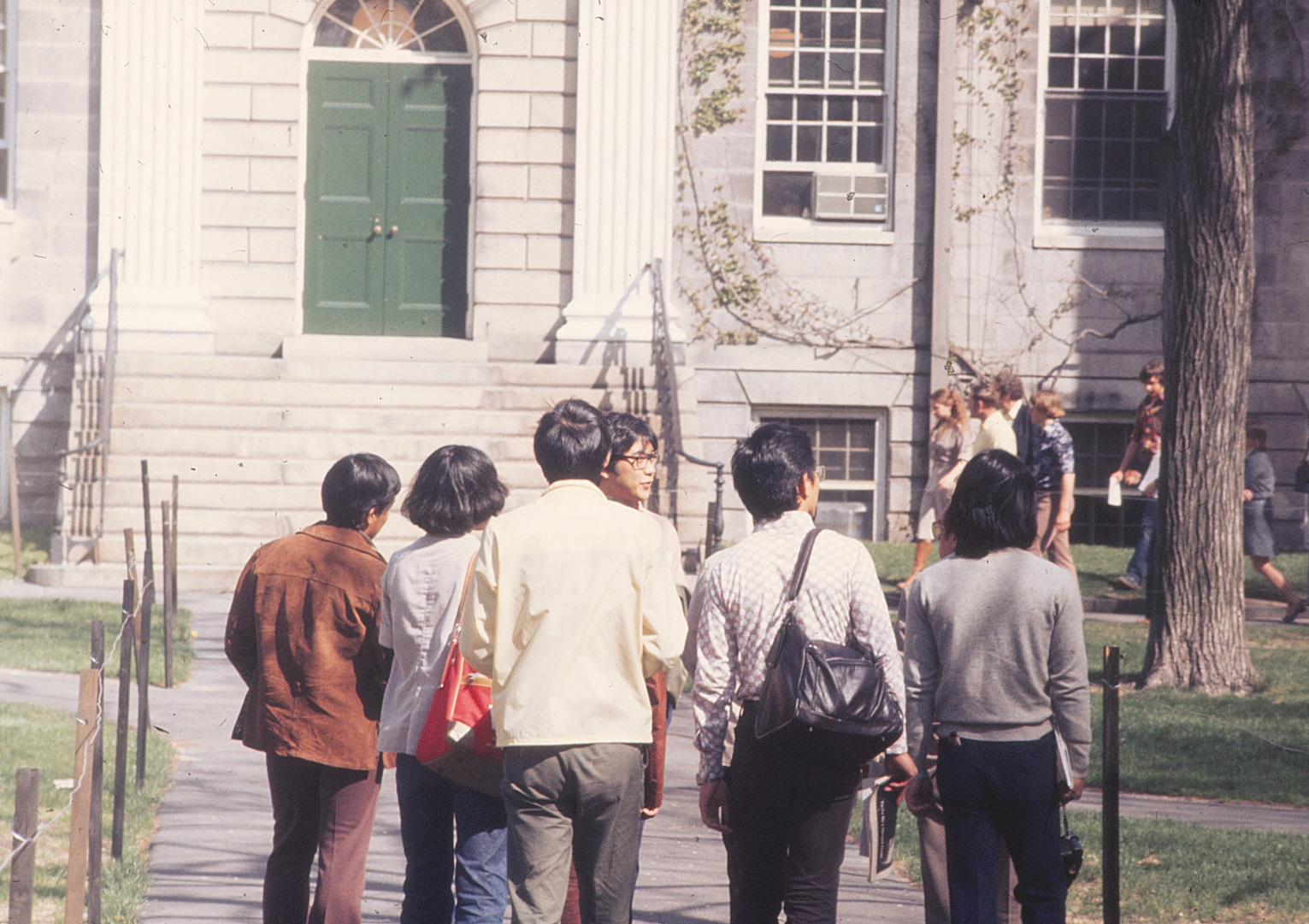
A student-led campus tour at Harvard University in 1976

In most cases a campus visit involves an information session directed by an admissions officer and a walking tour of campus conducted by a student ambassador. A campus visit can be taken by individual students and their families. Many colleges offer “open houses” usually consisting of a day or series of days set aside for students and their families to visit a particular school. Often there will be special programs or presentations during these times which would not be available during a regular visit. Most colleges and universities also offer private tours and information sessions for large groups from a single school or educational program.

Some schools provide overnight accommodation and meals, and students may sit-in on a class during their visit. Some programs pair a prospective student with a current student and allow the prospective student to shadow the current student for a day.

=== Information session ===
An admissions information session provides prospective students with knowledge about the college they are applying to. These sessions include information about admissions requirements, financial aid, and academic requirements for acceptance to that particular institution.

=== Sample campus visit ===
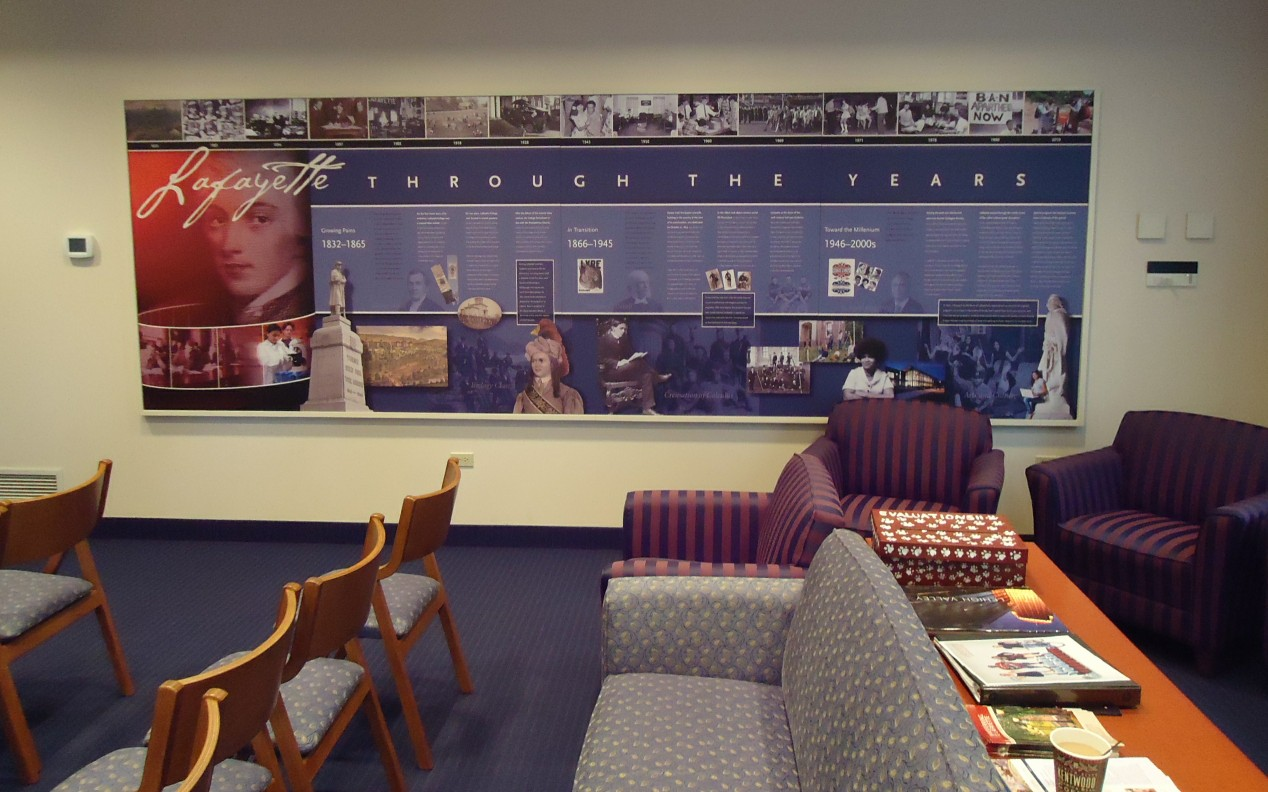
Admissions waiting lounge at Lafayette College in 2012

Time	Activities
9:00 – 9:15 am	Arrive on campus
9:15 – 10:00 am	Orientation given by the college admissions office, including: Welcome and campus introduction Information session Q&A session
10:00 – 11:00am	Campus walk, guided by a campus ambassador, including: Library; Classroom buildings / lecture halls Gymnasium / field / stadium Student union / cafeteria / bookstore
11:00 – 12:00pm	Individual exploration of campus: Talk with students Visit a dorm Shop at bookstore Talk to professors / coaches / recruiters Eat at cafeteria

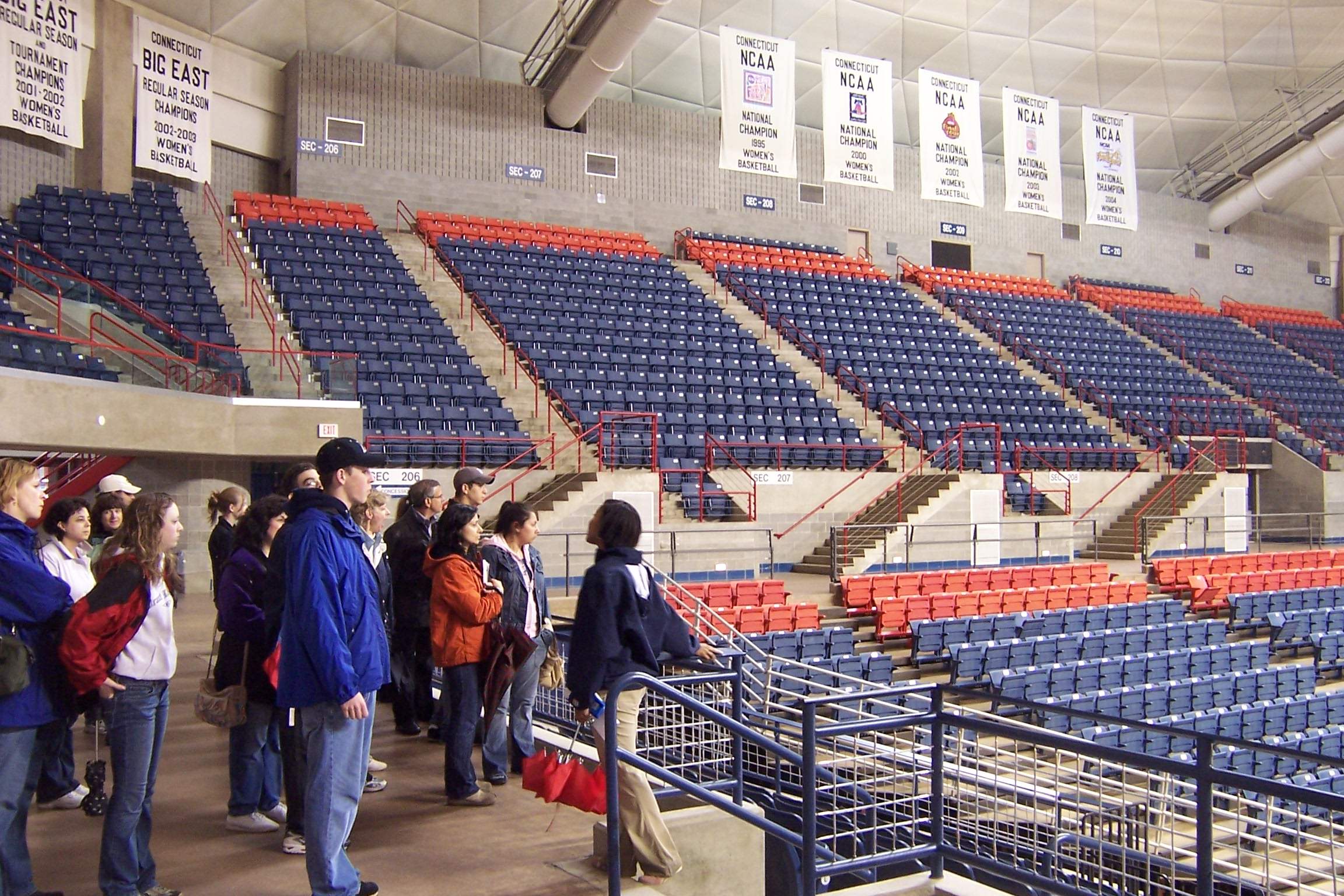
A student leading a 2005 campus tour at UConn shows off the school's women's basketball championship banners in the university's arena

== Other types of tours ==
- Online photographic tour
- Self-guided tour
- Podcast tour

== See also ==
- College admissions in the United States
- Transfer admissions in the United States
- Campustours
