= Woodrow Wilson Classical High School =

School in California, United States

Woodrow Wilson High School

- Wilson High School Science Building in 2005

Location
- 4400 East Tenth Street; Long Beach, California 90804; United States; 33.777042°N 118.140822°W

Information
- Type: Public
- Motto: Academic and Athletic Excellence
- Established: 1926; 100 years ago
- School district: Long Beach Unified
- Staff: 146.79 (FTE)
- Grades: 9–12
- Enrollment: 3,349 (2024–2025)
- Student to teacher ratio: 24.00
- Campus: Urban
- Colors: Cardinal red Gold
- Athletics conference: Moore League
- Mascot: Woody Bruin; Wilma Bruin; Wilbur Bruin
- Team name: Bruins
- Newspaper: Loudspeaker
- Yearbook: Campanile
- Website: https://wilson.lbschools.net

Woodrow Wilson High School (colloquially known as Long Beach Wilson) is an American public high school located in Long Beach, California. This two-block campus is located approximately 1.5 miles from the Pacific Ocean, across from the Recreation Park, and approximately 3 miles from Orange County.

Woodrow Wilson Classical High School was established in 1925 as the second school in the city, and ultimately opened for classes in 1926. The institution was named after Woodrow Wilson, who was an American politician and served as the 28th president of the United States. In 1926, a group of high school students chose the nickname Bruins as well as the colors Cardinal and Gold for Long Beach Wilson, due to close distance of two prestigious research universities, the University of California, Los Angeles and the University of Southern California, respectively.

== Academics ==
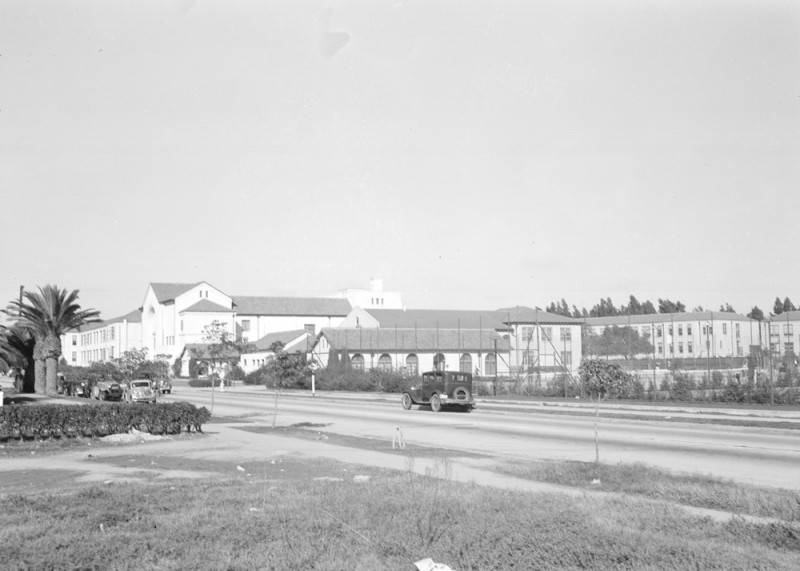
Wilson High School in Long Beach, c. 1935

Ethnic composition as of 2020–21
Race and ethnicity	Total
Hispanic or Latino	55.8%
Non-Hispanic White/Anglo	19.5%
African American	11.9%
Asian	8.4%
Other	3.7%
Pacific Islander	0.5%
Native American	0.2%

=== The "Classical" Term ===
Woodrow Wilson Classical High School earned the distinction of being "classical" (hence the term being in the official school name) when they offered graduates a diploma with higher distinction than the regular diploma across the Long Beach Unified School District. Those who earned the "classical" diploma fulfilled one year of performing or visual arts and two years of foreign language in addition to the minimum requirements to graduate from a LBUSD high school. Wilson is the only school to offer such a high school diploma in the district.

=== Pathways ===
The institution offers five distinct pathways: Wilson Academic Vision of Excellence, School of the Arts, School of Leadership & Public Service, School of Medicine & Biotechnology, and School of Technology. The Distinguished Scholars program is offered to students who are in a school pathway and met academic requirements in middle school.

==== Wilson Academic Vision of Excellence ====
Referred to as WAVE, the Wilson Academic Vision of Excellence is the most rigorous pathway offered at the school. This liberal arts intensive program provides students the resources to earn acceptances at elite universities and colleges. In order to be qualified, students must earn at least a 3.60 GPA in middle school, be enrolled in Algebra I, receive at least an SBAC score of 2,500 in English, and indicate that the program is their first choice prior to applying. During the program, students must follow a road-map to graduation, which includes at least ten Advanced Placement courses.

==== Distinguished Scholars ====
The oldest program at Long Beach Wilson, Distinguished Scholars provides supplemental distinction for all students outside of those in the WAVE pathway. Although not a pathway itself, the program recognizes those who had a strong academic performance at the institution. Incoming students must receive acceptance by having at least a 3.3 GPA and be enrolled in Algebra I prior to applying. Those not meeting the prerequisites may achieve this award by obtaining at least a 3.3 GPA and receiving a C or higher in Algebra I in addition to the program requirements. The program requires students to have at least a 3.3 GPA, complete four Advanced Placement classes, and possess at least sixty hours of volunteering outside of the school community.

==== School of the Arts ====
The School of the Arts emphasizes the study of the arts through completion of courses studying several disciplines within the field, ranging from theatre to photography. Students must choose a primary and secondary discipline to study at Long Beach Wilson, while completing the requirements for graduation. Students primarily have opportunities related to the arts, such as completing a certification program at Long Beach City College in their discipline of choice. There are no additional prerequisites for this program prior to applying.

==== School of Leadership and Public Service ====
Designed for the future leaders of society, this program has students embark on experiences in a wide range of public service sectors. Students have the opportunity to take coursework that focuses on ways to benefit a sector, varying from forensic science to criminal law. In addition, students have several opportunities within the city, such as completing related certificate programs at Long Beach City College. There are no prerequisites for this program prior to applying.

==== School of Medicine and Biotechnology ====
Initiated by Project Lead the Way, students in the School of Medicine and Biotechnology gain experience in preparation for the field of medicine. Students are required to take a course sequence dedicated to the study of medicine. In addition, students apply the course sequence to internships throughout medical centers in Long Beach, and receive certificates in cardiopulmonary resuscitation and first aid. There are no prerequisites for this program prior to applying.

==== School of Technology ====
Started by Project Lead the Way, program participants complete coursework in computer science and related fields. Participants are required to complete a course sequence that will prepare them for the rise of technology in today's society. In addition, students will have the opportunity to actively seek and experience internships in the technology industry with their knowledge from the course sequence. There are no prerequisites for this pathway.

=== Advanced Placement ===
Woodrow Wilson Classical High school is a participating institution of the Advanced Placement program, which offers students the opportunity to gain college credit albeit two-year and four-year colleges having different policies for granting A.P. credit, if any. The program is maintained by College Board, an organization that administers the AP exams. Long Beach Wilson offers students the chance to participate in Advanced Placement for 27 different disciplines. Although there may be requirements to take an A.P. class, it is possible to challenge any A.P. exam (where the student takes the exam by being an autodidact for the discipline tested), regardless if Long Beach Wilson offers the course or not. As of the 2014–15 school year, Long Beach Wilson had 49% of the 12th grade student body tested at some time during high school where 71% of those passed at least one exam.

Advanced Placement Courses
Art History; Biology; Calculus AB; Calculus BC; Chemistry; English Language and Composition; English Literature and Composition; Environmental Science; French Language and Culture	German Language and Culture; Human Geography; Macroeconomics; Music Theory; Physics 1; Physics 2; Psychology; Research; Seminar	Spanish Language and Culture; Spanish Literature and Culture; Statistics; Studio Art: 2-D; Studio Art: 3-D; Studio Art: Drawing; United States Government and Politics; United States History; World History

=== College admissions ===
The Class of 2021 spans throughout California within the California State University and University of California system, although alumni especially committed to universities in Southern California. The most popular destinations within both systems are Long Beach State (117 alumni), UCLA (13 alumni), Cal State Dominguez Hills (12 alumni), UC Santa Barbara (10 alumni), and UC Berkeley (9 alumni). Long Beach Wilson graduates are granted two years of free tuition at Long Beach City College, which has a dedicated Transfer Admission Guarantee resource center for transferring to the majority of UC and CSU Campuses. Admissions at private universities are sparse, but enrollments most recently occurred at Dartmouth, Pomona College, and Vassar College. Below are admissions tables derived from the University of California and California State University for the Class of 2021:

University of California
Institution	Applied	Admitted	Enrolled
Berkeley	111	23	9
Davis	75	38	5
Irvine	134	31	6
Los Angeles	200	18	13
Merced	19	18	0
Riverside	50	29	4
San Diego	134	38	5
Santa Barbara	125	48	10
Santa Cruz	70	45	8

California State University (SoCal)
Institution	Applied	Admitted	Enrolled
Bakersfield	11	9	0
Channel Islands	11	10	1
Dominguez Hills	87	81	12
Fullerton	104	51	3
Long Beach	366	293	117
Los Angeles	64	59	4
Northridge	21	18	3
Pomona	57	38	1
San Bernardino	6	6	0
San Diego	125	54	7
San Luis Obispo	91	55	6
San Marcos	7	7	2

California State University (NorCal)
Institution	Applied	Admitted	Enrolled
Chico	27	19	2
East Bay	16	14	1
Fresno	3	2	0
Humboldt	8	7	0
Maritime	4	4	2
Monterey Bay	21	21	2
Sacramento	13	13	0
San Francisco	49	46	5
San Jose	16	16	1
Sonoma	2	1	0
Stanislaus	4	4	0

=== Rankings ===
- According to US News, Long Beach Wilson is No. 240 in the state and No. 1,301 in the nation for best overall high schools for the 2016–17 school year. Wilson also earned a silver medal, a distinction awarded for placing 501st to 2,673th best in the nation and had at least a 20.17 college readiness index. Wilson is the fifth best high school in the Long Beach Unified School District.
- According to The Washington Post, Woodrow Wilson Classical High School is No. 1,024 in the nation for "America's Most Challenging High Schools."
- According to Niche, Long Beach Wilson is No. 150 in the nation for "Standout Schools in America," which recognizes how much the school has positively impacted their community. Also, Wilson is No. 294 in the nation for "Most Diverse Public High Schools in America," which notes the diversity of a high school in terms of ethnicity.

== Athletics ==
The Long Beach Wilson Bruins participate in the CIF Southern Section under the California Interscholastic Federation. The Bruins are primarily associated with the Moore League for conference play. The Bruins have a fierce rivalry with the Jackrabbits of Long Beach Poly across all sports, which originated from an American football match in 1932.

=== Varsity teams ===
The Bruins sponsor varsity teams in 12 boys', 12 girls', and three coed sports. All are CIF-sponsored sports unless indicated.

Boys

- Baseball
- Basketball
- Cross country
- Football
- Golf
- Lacrosse
- Soccer
- Swimming & diving
- Tennis
- Track and field
- Volleyball
- Water polo

Girls

- Basketball
- Cross country
- Golf
- Gymnastics
- Lacrosse
- Soccer
- Softball
- Swimming & diving
- Tennis
- Track and field
- Volleyball
- Water polo

Coed

- Badminton
- Surfing
- Wrestling

=== Championships ===
Long Beach Wilson has won 11 state, and 2 national championships since the institution fielded athletics in 1926.

==== State championships ====
- Boys (6)
  - Track and field: 1931
  - Water polo: 2001, 2002, 2003, 2004, 2005
- Girls (5)
  - Golf: 2004
  - Soccer: 2008
  - Track and field: 1996, 1998, 2006, 2023

==== National championships ====
- Boys (1)
  - Baseball: 2007
- Girls (1)
  - Soccer: 2008

== Alumni ==
Since the 1952 Summer Olympics, 38 Bruins have participated in the quadrennial Olympic Games. By the conclusion of the 2016 Summer Olympics, the Bruins have gathered 16 Olympiads. Long Beach Wilson has been recognized by ESPN for their output of Olympians.

Notable Long Beach Wilson alumni include:

- George Chakiris, Academy Award-winning actor
- Bob Bailey, former professional baseball player
- Cynthia Barboza, professional volleyball player
- Lashinda Demus, professional hurdler
- Bobby Grich, former professional baseball player
- Jessica Hardy, professional swimmer
- Aaron Hicks, professional baseball player
- Gabriel Iglesias, actor, comedian, producer, voice actor, and writer
- Camryn Manheim, actress
- Bruce McCandless II, former astronaut, aviator, electrical engineer, NASA employee, and naval officer
- Swen Nater, Dutch former professional basketball player
- Bradley Nowell, frontman of the ska punk band Sublime
