= Moore League =

High school sports league in California

The Moore League is a high school sports league in Southern California. It comprises seven schools: public traditional high schools of the Long Beach Unified School District plus Compton High School. The league is administered by the California Interscholastic Federation (CIF) Southern Section.

== Member schools ==
- Cabrillo High School
- Jordan High School
- Lakewood High School
- Millikan High School
- Polytechnic High School
- Wilson High School
- Compton High School

== Origins ==
The Moore League was founded in 1957. As of 1963, Downey High School was a member, and Compton High was not yet a member. Cabrillo High was established in 1995, and became the Moore League's seventh member. El Rancho High School was a member of the Moore League from 1969 to 1971

== Harry J. Moore ==
The Moore League is named for Harry J. Moore, who was an educator in Long Beach, California. He held the following positions, titles and honors:

- Assistant Superintendent in the Long Beach Public Schools (Long Beach Unified School District)
- Director of High Schools, Public School System, Long Beach
- Honorary Inductee, Wilson High School Athletics Hall of Fame
