= Campustours =

American edu-tech and virtual reality company

CampusTours Inc
- Type: Privately held
- Industry: Educational technology
- Founded: Pittsburgh, Pennsylvania 1997
- Headquarters: Auburn, Maine, U.S.
- Area served: Worldwide
- Key people: Christopher Carson, president and chief executive officer
- Products: CampusTours AnyMap; CampusTours AnyTour; CampusTours WalkingTour
- Website: campustours.com

CampusTours Inc. (formerly CampusTours LLC) operates CampusTours.com a directory of information about tours of higher education institutions including virtual tours, and CampusMaps.com a directory of information about the campus maps of Higher education institutions. CampusTours is located in Auburn, Maine, and is privately held.

== History ==
CampusTours Inc. is a software services vendor and online directory with headquarters in Auburn, Maine, that is primarily known as a developer of virtual tours and interactive maps, and as the proprietor of CampusTours.com, a source for virtual college tours, and CampusMaps.com a source for campus maps. CampusTours was founded in 1997 by Christopher Carson in Pittsburgh, Pennsylvania. The company provided links to the virtual tours, interactive maps and videos of colleges and universities, and was supported by advertising revenue.

In June 1999, CampusTours was acquired by the college services company College Enterprises Inc (later renamed iCollege Inc). Blackboard purchased iCollege/College Enterprises in November 2000 and CampusTours became a part of Blackboard. CampusTours was spun out of Blackboard in 2001 as a separate company (CampusTours Inc.) and moved to Maine. In 2002 CampusTours began building tours for colleges and universities, and in 2004 CampusTours debuted the first version of the company's multimedia engine tour software system. CampusTours now builds content-managed virtual tours and interactive maps.
