= Transfer Admission Guarantee =

A Transfer Admission Guarantee (also known as a TAG agreement) is a program that offers students from a community college guaranteed admissions to several colleges and universities. The writing of a TAG contract enables qualified students to be guaranteed admissions one year prior to transfer. Students must meet certain requirements to be eligible for a TAG.

== California Community Colleges ==
California's TAG program began in the early 1980s, according to one source. For California community college students to write a TAG agreement, they must complete 60 transferable units (for either the California State University (CSU) or University of California (UC)), have completed major prerequisites, and have a Grade Point Average (GPA) of a 3.4 (higher GPA required for some majors and colleges).

== Participating UCs ==
Six UC campuses offer guaranteed admission to California community college students who meet these specific requirements. Another benefit of writing a TAG is that students receive early review of their academic records, early admission notification, and specific guidance about major preparation and general education coursework.

The TAG matrix provides a list of participating campuses, eligibility criteria, and campus-specific notes.

== A list of participating UCs include ==
1. UC Davis
2. UC Irvine
3. UC Merced
4. UC Riverside
5. UC Santa Barbara
6. UC Santa Cruz
