= Beazley Medal =

Academic award

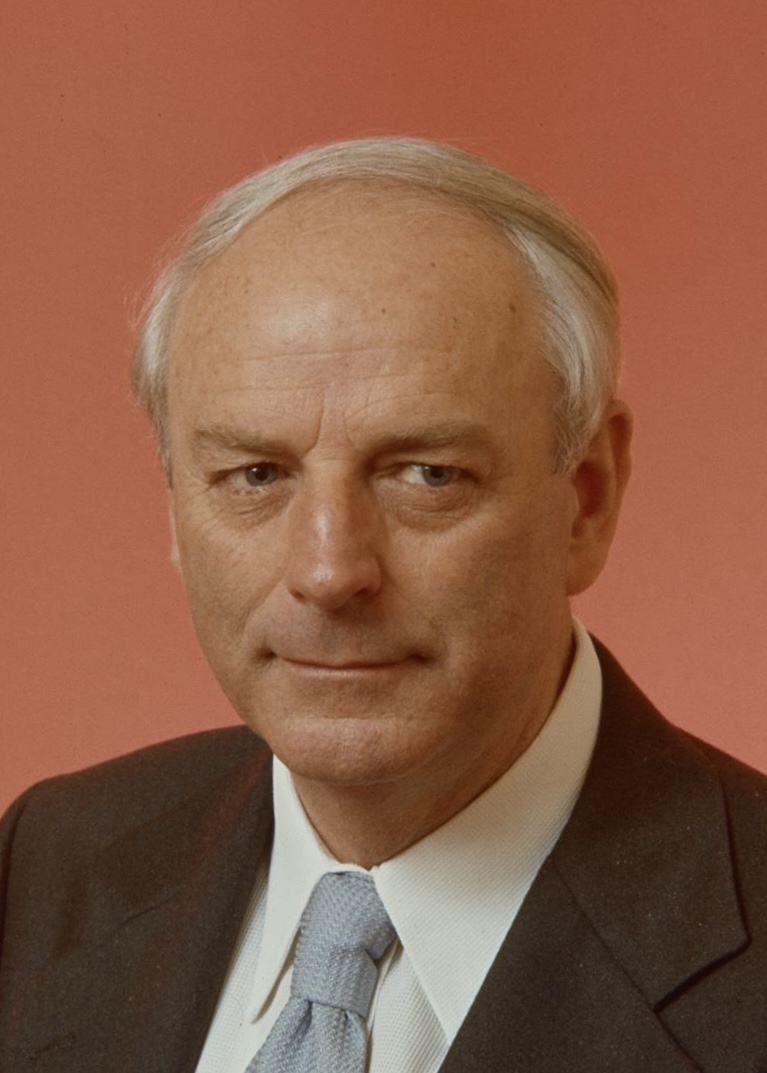
The awards are named after Kim Beazley Sr., the Federal Education Minister during the Whitlam government

The Beazley Medals are two annual awards awarded by the School Curriculum and Standards Authority (and previously the Curriculum Council of Western Australia). From 2001 onwards, two medals have been awarded each year — one to the top TEE student (WACE from 2010 onward) and one to the top vocational education and training (VET) student.

The medal was first awarded in 1984 and is named after former Federal Education Minister Kim Beazley Sr. In 2000, a new student award, the Excellence in Vocational Studies Award, was introduced for the student who demonstrated the best results in a secondary school vocational program. The award was renamed the Beazley Medal: VET in the following year to reflect its equal status.

== Past winners ==
=== Beazley Medal: TEE/WACE ===
- 1984: Jason George Cyster, Guildford Grammar School
- 1985: Patrick Hon-Shing Lai, Christ Church Grammar School
- 1986: Sherwant Singh Gill, Lynwood Senior High School
- 1987: David John Holthouse, Wanneroo Senior High School
- 1988: Eu-Jin Ang, Christ Church Grammar School
- 1989: Howard Ho-Wah Yip, Churchlands Senior High School
- 1990: Rae-Lin Huang, Hollywood Senior High School
- 1991: Graham Alistair Thom, Gosnells Senior High School
- 1992: Jonathan Paget, Churchlands Senior High School
- 1993: Bertrand Sze Yu Lee, Applecross Senior High School
- 1994: Bonnie Kar Yee Chu, Presbyterian Ladies' College
- 1995: Anthea Lee Prestage, St Hilda's Anglican School for Girls
- 1996: David Chen Liaw, Christ Church Grammar School
- 1997: Mamie Tong, Penrhos College
- 1998: Michael Molinari (TEE), Christ Church Grammar School - shared with Michael Gibson
- 1999: Neil Rabinowitz (TEE), Carmel School
- 2000: Anthony Phillips (TEE), Hale School
- 2001: Antony Moser (TEE), Hale School
- 2002: Jolene Carmen Yap, (TEE), St Hilda's Anglican School for Girls
- 2003: Dougal Maclaurin (TEE), Hale School
- 2004: Carryn Vincec (TEE), Perth College
- 2005: Adrian Khoo (TEE), Scotch College
- 2006: Chris Mofflin (TEE), Hale School
- 2007: Neil Thomas (TEE), Wesley College
- 2008: Binu Jayawardena (TEE), Hale School
- 2009: Hayley Anderson (TEE), Churchlands Senior High School
- 2010: Michael Taran (WACE), Perth Modern School
- 2011: Calum Braham (WACE), Trinity College
- 2012: Katie Dyer (WACE), St Hilda's Anglican School for Girls
- 2013: Katerina Chua (WACE), St Hilda's Anglican School for Girls
- 2014: Jamin Wu (WACE), Perth Modern School
- 2015: Hui Min Tay (WACE), Perth Modern School
- 2016: Caitlin Revell (WACE), Perth Modern School
- 2017: Isabel Longbottom (WACE), Rossmoyne Senior High School
- 2018: Pooja Ramesh (WACE), Perth Modern School
- 2019: Charlotte "Charlie" Singleton (WACE), Methodist Ladies' College
- 2020: Josh Green (WACE), Christ Church Grammar School
- 2021: Lawrence Nheu (WACE), Perth Modern School
- 2022: Jessica Doan (WACE), Perth Modern School
- 2023: Elena Latchem (WACE), Methodist Ladies' College
- 2024: Ethan Yap (WACE), Perth Modern School
- 2025: Cohen Beveridge (WACE), Willetton Senior High School

=== Beazley Medal: VET ===
- 2000: Darren Chapman, WA College of Agriculture, Narrogin (Excellence in Vocational Studies Award)
- 2001: Bianca Batten, Forrestfield Senior High School
- 2002: Natasha Lea Pierce, Clarkson Community High School
- 2003: Joel David Treeby, WA College of Agriculture, Denmark
- 2004: Lachlan Patterson, WA College of Agriculture, Narrogin
- 2005: Linda Greenwood Tully, Methodist Ladies' College
- 2006: Michael Gibbings, WA School of Agriculture, Harvey
- 2007: Michelle Kite, Corpus Christi College
- 2008: Emma Hudson, St Mary's Anglican Girls' School
- 2009: Andrew Reynolds, WA College of Agriculture, Cunderdin
- 2010: Jaclyn East, WA College of Agriculture, Narrogin
- 2011: Nicole Kerr, Woodvale Secondary College
- 2012: Madisen Scott, Woodvale Secondary College
- 2013: Emma Hay, Georgiana Molloy Anglican School
- 2014: Robert Rubery, Applecross Senior High School
- 2015: Megan McSeveney, WA College of Agriculture, Harvey
- 2016: Tate Bertola, Esperance Senior High School
- 2017: Andreea Ioan, Willetton Senior High School
- 2018: Jess Haydon, Swan Valley Anglican Community School
- 2019: Jesse Morris-Parmer, St Mark's Anglican Community School
- 2020: Luke de Laeter, Wesley College
- 2021: Charlotte Crossen, WA College of Agriculture, Cunderdin
- 2022: Ashton Fowler, Harrisdale Senior High School
- 2023: Isaac Panozzo, Melville Senior High School
- 2024: Kevin Castle, Kent Street High School
- 2025: Holly Hunter, Rossmoyne Senior High School
