= 2001 in Australia =

- Monarch: Elizabeth II
- Governor-General: Sir William Deane, then Peter Hollingworth
- Prime minister: John Howard
- Population: 19,413,240
- Elections: WA, QLD, NT, ACT, Federal

The following lists events that happened during 2001 in Australia.

- Decades: 1980s; 1990s; 2000s; 2010s; 2020s
- See also: 2001 in Australian television; 2001 in Australian literature; Other events of 2001; Federal election; Timeline of Australian history

== Incumbents ==
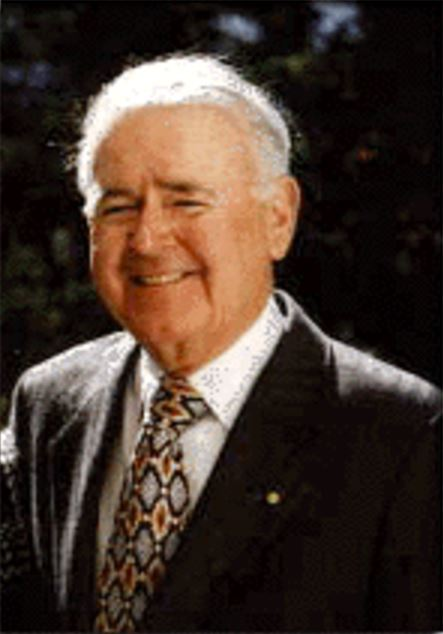
Sir William Deane

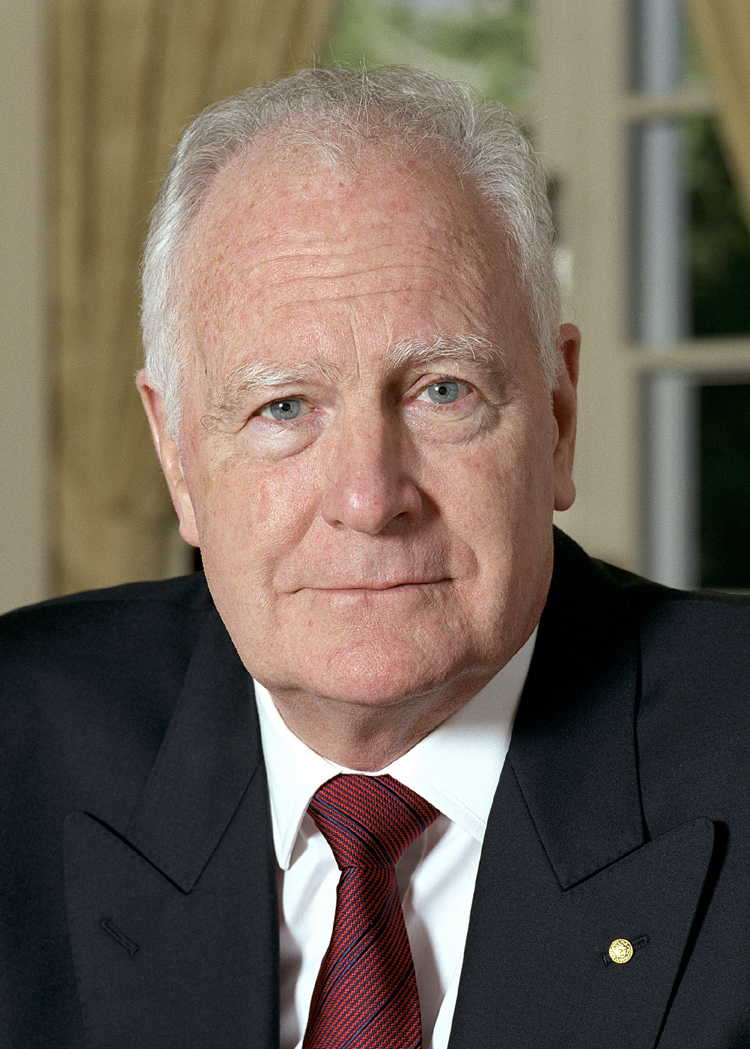
Peter Hollingworth

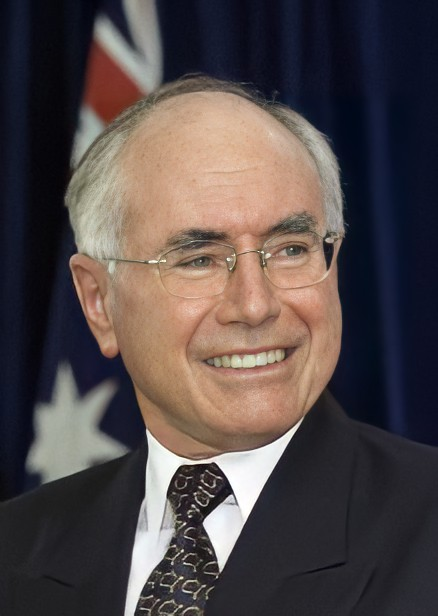
John Howard

- Monarch – Elizabeth II
- Governor-General – Sir William Deane (until 29 June), then Peter Hollingworth
- Prime Minister – John Howard
  - Deputy Prime Minister – John Anderson
  - Opposition Leader – Kim Beazley (until 22 November), then Simon Crean
- Chief Justice – Murray Gleeson

=== State and Territory Leaders ===
- Premier of New South Wales – Bob Carr
  - Opposition Leader – Kerry Chikarovski
- Premier of Queensland – Peter Beattie
  - Opposition Leader – Rob Borbidge (until 2 March), then Mike Horan
- Premier of South Australia – John Olsen (until 22 October), then Rob Kerin
  - Opposition Leader – Mike Rann
- Premier of Tasmania – Jim Bacon
  - Opposition Leader – Sue Napier (until 20 August), then Bob Cheek
- Premier of Victoria – Steve Bracks
  - Opposition Leader – Denis Napthine
- Premier of Western Australia – Richard Court (until 10 February), then Geoff Gallop
  - Opposition Leader – Geoff Gallop (until 10 February), then Richard Court (until 26 February), then Colin Barnett
- Chief Minister of the Australian Capital Territory – Gary Humphries (until 5 November), then Jon Stanhope
  - Opposition Leader – Jon Stanhope (until 5 November), then Gary Humphries
- Chief Minister of the Northern Territory – Denis Burke (until 27 August), then Clare Martin
  - Opposition Leader – Clare Martin (until 27 August), then Denis Burke
- Chief Minister of Norfolk Island – Ronald Nobbs (until 5 December), then Geoffrey Gardner

=== Governors and Administrators ===
- Governor of New South Wales – Gordon Samuels (until 1 March), then Marie Bashir
- Governor of Queensland – Peter Arnison
- Governor of South Australia – Sir Eric Neal (until 3 November), then Marjorie Jackson-Nelson
- Governor of Tasmania – Sir Guy Green
- Governor of Victoria – John Landy (from 1 January)
- Governor of Western Australia – John Sanderson
- Administrator of the Australian Indian Ocean Territories – Bill Taylor
- Administrator of Norfolk Island – Tony Messner
- Administrator of the Northern Territory – John Anictomatis

== Events ==
=== January ===
- 1 January – A ceremony at Uluru (Ayers Rock) and a parade in Sydney kick off a year of celebrations to mark the centenary of federation.
- 8 January – Immigration Minister Philip Ruddock explains on Iranian television the hazards of illegal migration to Australia.
- 17 January – Employment Minister Tony Abbott advocates Work for the Dole for all persons unemployed for more than six months.
- 30 January – Queensland Premier Peter Beattie demands that Prime Minister John Howard halt the Federal Parliamentary inquiry investigating electoral rorts.

=== February ===
- 10 February – In Western Australia, the Liberal/National coalition government of Richard Court is voted out and replaced by the Australian Labor Party (ALP), led by Geoff Gallop.
- 27 February – The Labor government of Peter Beattie is comfortably re-elected for a second term in Queensland, despite a scandal that broke out weeks before the election that involved breaches of the Electoral Act by several MPs, including the Deputy Premier.

=== March ===
- 1 March – West Australian Premier Geoff Gallop ends all old growth logging in the state.
- 2 March – Victorian Premier Steve Bracks pleads for Transurban to drop its $36 million compensation claim against the State.
- 16 March – HIH Insurance goes into provisional liquidation, but claims it can cover all household and third party policies.
- 17 March – Labor candidate Leonie Short wins the Ryan by-election in Queensland, defeating Liberal candidate, Bob Tucker.

=== April ===
- 8 April – Immigration Minister Philip Ruddock refers to the Curtin Immigration Reception and Processing Centre rioters as "publicity seekers".
- 11 April – The Australia national men's soccer team sets a world record for the largest victory in an international association football match, winning the game 31–0 against American Samoa at the 2002 FIFA World Cup qualifiers for OFC. Australia's Archie Thompson also breaks the record for most goals scored by a player in an international match by scoring 13 goals.

=== May ===
- 7 May – Queensland Premier Peter Beattie orders a dingo cull on Fraser Island after 9-year-old Clinton Gage is mauled to death by a dingo on 30 April.
- 9 May – a special joint sitting of the Australian Parliament was held at the Royal Exhibition Building in Melbourne, commemorating the centenary of the opening of the first Parliament of Australia exactly 100 years earlier. The joint sitting was addressed by the Governor-General, Sir William Deane.
- 21 May – The Federal Government announces a commission into the HIH insurance disaster with $500 million allocated to victims.
- 24 May – Former HIH Insurance director, Rodney Adler fights an attempt to freeze his assets.

=== June ===
- 7 June – Prime Minister John Howard rejects the suggestion by the new Anglican Archbishop of Sydney that he is out of step with God regarding his views on reconciliation.
- 10 June – Seven detainees of Middle Eastern origin escape from the Woomera Detention Centre, South Australia, on the same day that Australian and international media are allowed to tour the Curtin Immigration Reception and Processing Centre in Western Australia.
- 21 June – Prime Minister John Howard rejects renewed Opposition demands to sack Aged Care Minister Bronwyn Bishop following the painful death of an elderly woman in aged care.
- 27 June – The New South Wales Government agrees to support South Australia's bid to build an electricity riverlink interconnector between the two states, giving access to cheaper power from the east.
- 29 June – Anglican Archbishop of Brisbane Dr Peter Hollingworth is sworn in as Governor-General of Australia. He would later resign amidst controversy over his handling of child sex cases during his time as Archbishop.

=== July ===
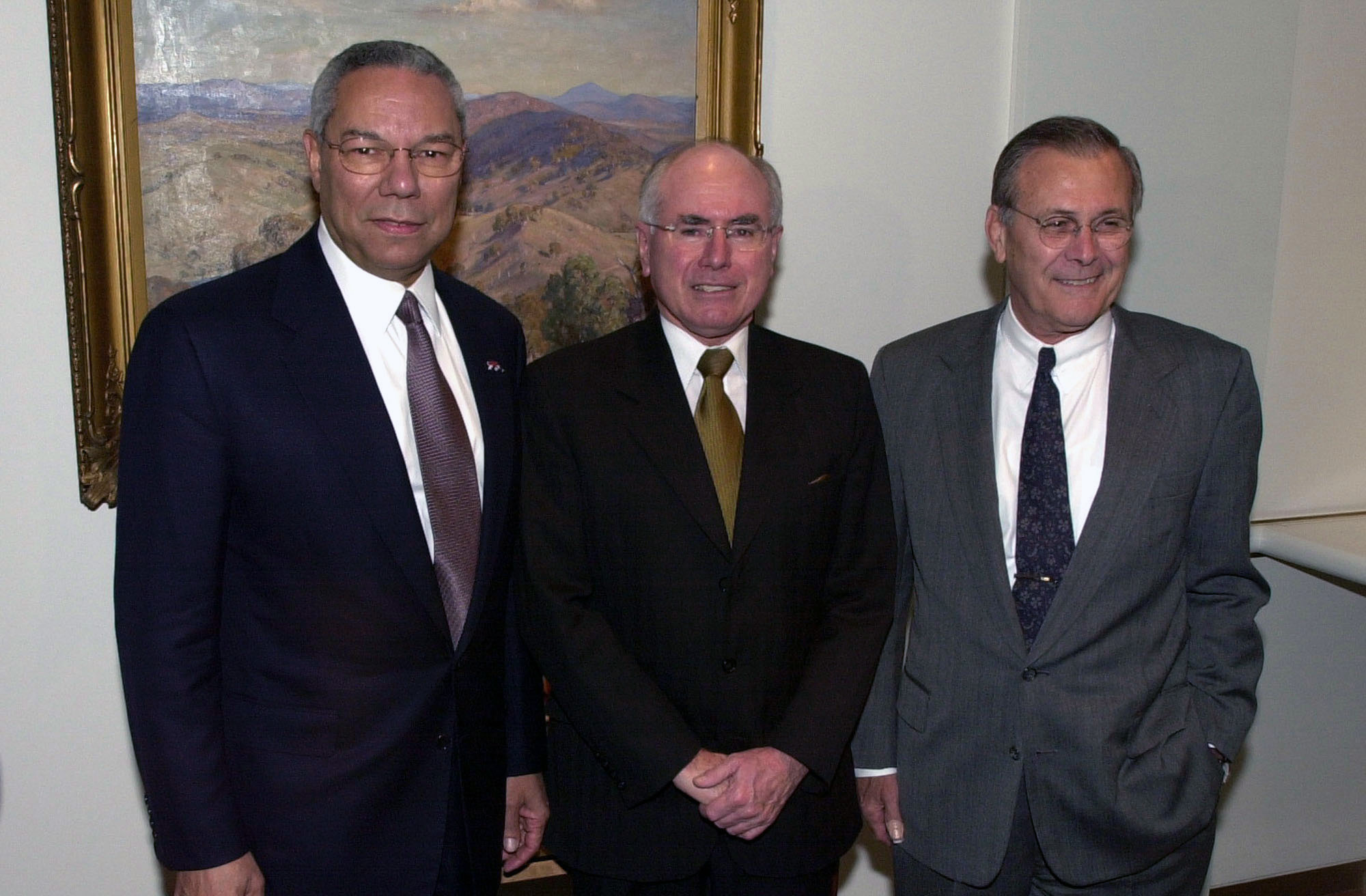
Australian Prime Minister John Howard (center) poses for a photograph with U.S. Secretary of Defense Donald Rumsfeld (right) and U.S. Secretary of State Colin Powell, inside the Australian Prime Minister's offices at the Parliament House, Canberra, Australia, on 30 July 2001. Two U.S. Secretaries are in Australia to attend Australia-U.S. Ministerial (AUSMIN) talks and conduct meetings with high-level government military and civilian officials.

- 10 July – West Australian Premier Geoff Gallop announces that State Government-AMA talks will be halted until doctors end their industrial action.
- 14 July – Liberal candidate Chris Pearce wins the 2001 Aston by-election in Victoria.
- 20 July – Australian citizen Vivian Solon is unlawfully deported to the Philippines by the Department of Immigration.

=== August ===
- 8 August – Prime Minister John Howard says he will block any attempts of a heroin trial in the Australian Capital Territory. However, the ACT Government pushes ahead with the drug referendum.
- 14 August – The Australian Catholic University announces that its new General Staff Enterprise Bargaining Agreement includes a provision for one year's paid maternity leave, 12 weeks on full pay and a further 40 weeks on 60% pay.
- 15 August – Long-time South Australian MP and Party Whip, Murray DeLaine, quits Labor and announces that he is running as an independent at the next state election.
- 18 August – For the first time since self-government was granted to the Northern Territory in 1978, the Country Liberal Party is voted out of office and replaced by the ALP
- 24 August – The Tampa affair begins when the MV Tampa tries to help a boatload of refugees, mainly from Afghanistan. The crisis is resolved when New Zealand agrees to take some of the refugees and countries such as Nauru and Papua New Guinea agree to take the rest. This was known as the Pacific Solution.
- 30 August – Prime Minister John Howard urges Indonesian President Megawati Sukarnoputri to accept asylum seekers currently on board the MV Tampa.

=== September ===
- 10 September – Prime Minister John Howard starts his United States tour in Washington, D.C., shortly before the September 11 attacks happen.
- 12 September – Ansett Australia, one of the oldest airlines in the world and the second-largest in Australia goes under administration with KordaMentha due to major financial struggles. Despite this administrators assure the public that flights will continue as normal.
- 14 September- Just two days after going into administration, Ansett Australia ceases operations resulting in a redundancy of 15,000 staff and tens of thousands of stranded passengers. This occurs despite former assurance by the administrators that no such thing would happen.
- 24 September – Prime Minister John Howard urges Qantas to reach a quick agreement to put some Ansett Airlines planes back in the air as soon as possible following the company's collapse.
- 26 September – Prime Minister John Howard dedicates the Magna Carta monument near Old Parliament house as part of a Centenary of Federation project.
- 27 September – The Federal Government passes legislation with amendments to the Commonwealth Migration Act (1958) aimed at implementing the Government's Pacific Solution. By redefining the area of Australian territory that could be landed upon and then legitimately used for claims of asylum (the migration zone), and by removing any intercepted people to third countries for processing, the aim was to deter future asylum seekers from making the dangerous journey by boat, once they knew that their trip would probably not end with a legitimate claim for asylum in Australia.

=== October ===
- 6 October – SIEV-4 reached Christmas Island with 223 passengers. It was alleged by several in the government that asylum seekers aboard this vessel threw their children overboard in order to attract the attention of Australian authorities. This later became known as the 'Children Overboard Affair'
- 12 October – SIEV-5 reaches Ashmore Reef with 242 passengers.
- 14 October –
  - Immigration Minister Philip Ruddock claims that boat people now in Nauru attacked sailors and caused damage to HMAS Manoora.
  - Federal Opposition Leader Kim Beazley is declared the winner of a televised debate with Prime Minister John Howard in the lead-up to the Federal Election.
- 16 October – Prime Minister John Howard pledges, if re-elected, to introduce retrospective legislation imposing ten years in jail for anyone found guilty of sending hoax threats of biological or chemical material through the mail. The announcement follows 24 hours of hoax anthrax threats throughout the nation, which had resulted in offices being evacuated, airports cleared, and post offices coming to a sudden halt.
- 18 October – SIEV-6 reaches Christmas Island with 227 passengers.
- 19 October –
  - SIEV-X, an Indonesian fishing boat en route to Christmas Island, carrying over 400 asylum seekers, sank in international waters with the loss of 353 people.
  - South Australian Premier John Olsen resigns in tears after an inquiry finds that he has been dishonest to an investigation into how Motorola set up operations in South Australia.
- 20 October –
  - The Legislative Assembly election in the Australian Capital Territory results in the Labor Party coming to power for the first time since 1995.
  - Prime Minister John Howard attends the APEC Summit in China.
- 22 October –
  - Rob Kerin is voted by 22 MPs as South Australia's 43rd Premier.
  - SIEV-7 reached Ashmore Reef with 233 passengers.
- October – Australia agrees to provide 1550 troops to the US operation in Afghanistan.
- 28 October – Prime Minister John Howard makes a speech at his 2001 election campaign policy launch in Sydney, declaring that "we will decide who comes to this country and the circumstances in which they come" in an effort to build support for the Government's Pacific Solution policy.

=== November ===
- 8 November – Katherine Knight is sentenced to life in imprisonment without possibility of parole for the murder of her partner John Price, whom she stabbed 37 times, beheaded, dismembered and then cooked.
- 10 November – In the wake of the 11 September attacks and the Tampa crisis, the Liberal/National coalition government of John Howard is re-elected for a third term in office. Kim Beazley resigns as opposition leader and is replaced by Simon Crean.
- 26 November – Former director of collapsed HIH Insurance giant, Rodney Adler faces court on charges involving a $7 million loss.
- 27 November – A Beechcraft C90 operated by Eastland Air crashes after take-off at Toowoomba City Aerodrome, killing four people.
- 28 November – West Australian Premier Geoff Gallop announces that an inquiry will be held into child abuse in Aboriginal communities.

=== December ===
- 12 December – South Australian Premier Rob Kerin pledges $25 million to improve industrial infrastructure in the Upper Spencer Gulf.
- 18 December – Fires at Woomera Detention Centre are lit by detainees in protest.
- 25 December – 6 January – Bushfires rage across New South Wales. No-one is killed.
- 26 December
  - The south coast tornado occurs during the 2001 Sydney to Hobart Yacht Race.
  - A campaign run by the Australian Council of Trade Unions (ACTU) and the Equal Opportunity Commission attempts to secure 14 weeks' paid maternity leave for working mothers.

== Arts and literature ==
- ARIA Music Awards of 2001
- Frank Moorhouse's novel Dark Palace wins the Miles Franklin Award

== Film ==
- 4 October – The Australian film Lantana debuts.

== Television ==
- 1 January – Digital Television arrives in the major state capitals of Australia, with the ABC and SBS permitted to operate multi-channel services.
- 25 January – The Seven Network loses the TV rights to the AFL for the first time, since televised football began in 1957. The rights are won by a Nine Network-Network Ten-Foxtel consortium.
- 1 February – The Network Ten undergoes a major revamp in its production and circle logo on air graphics as part of a new network re-launch, with the launch of its motto Seriously Ten, which are both current used to the 2012 revamp.
- 24 April – The Australian version of Big Brother premieres on Network Ten.
- 11 September – Television networks relay coverage from CNN, NBC, ABC America and the BBC for up to 48 hours in the wake of the 11 September attacks.
- November – After Prime Television axes Regional television news bulletins in Newcastle, Wollongong and Canberra, and Southern Cross Ten axes regional bulletins in Canberra and North Queensland, the ABA holds an inquiry into the adequacy of regional news services. Bulletins eventually return to those areas in 2004, albeit in the form of two-minute updates during weekdays in the ratings season.
- December – After 21 years, Sale of the Century is "rested". It later returns to the Nine Network as Temptation in 2005.

== Sport ==
- 23 March – First day of the Australian Track & Field Championships for the 2000–2001 season, which are held at the ANZ Stadium in Brisbane, Queensland. The 5,000 metres (men and women) were conducted at the Hobart Grand Prix, Tasmania on Sunday 11 March 2001. The 10,000 metres (men and women) were conducted at the Zatopek Classic, Melbourne on Monday 4 December 2000.
- 1 June – Australia shock reigning world champions France 1–0 in a group stage game in the Confederations Cup. The Socceroos later go on to claim 3rd place in the tournament, by beating superpower Brazil 1–0.
- 3 June – Wollongong Wolves defeat Minor Premiers South Melbourne 2–1 in the National Soccer League Grand Final at Parramatta Stadium, becoming Champions for the second season in succession.
- 1 July – Allan Langer makes a spectacular comeback to Australian rugby league to lead the Queensland team to a 40–14 victory over their New South Wales counterparts in the third and deciding game of the 2001 State of Origin series at ANZ Stadium.
- 22 July – Essendon produces the greatest comeback in VFL/AFL history to defeat the Kangaroos by 12 points after being 69 points down during the second quarter.
- 26 August – Following the conclusion of the final main round in the 2001 NRL season, the Parramatta Eels claim the minor premiership, while the Penrith Panthers finish in last position on games lost, points against and points difference, claiming the wooden spoon.
- 31 August – The Sydney Swifts defeat the Adelaide Thunderbirds 57–32 in the Commonwealth Bank Trophy netball grand final.
- 29 September – The Brisbane Lions (15.18.108) defeat the Essendon (12.10.82) to win the 105th VFL/AFL premiership. It is the first of three consecutive premierships for Brisbane & until March 2007, the last ever game of Australian rules football broadcast on the Seven Network until 2008.
- 30 September – The 2001 NRL season culminates in the Newcastle Knights defeating minor premiers the Parramatta Eels 30–24 in the 2001 NRL grand final.
- 7 October – Mark Skaife and Tony Longhurst survive a late race challenge from Brad Jones and John Bowe to win the V8Supercar Bathurst 1000 for the Holden Racing Team.
- 28 October – Borislav Devic wins the men's national marathon title, clocking 2:29:11 in Sydney, while Krishna Wood claims the women's title in 2:38:11.
- 6 November – Sheila Laxon becomes the first female trainer to win the Melbourne Cup when Ethereal wins.
- 25 November – The Socceroos lose 0–3 to Uruguay in the 2nd leg of the CONMEBOL-OFC playoff & fail to qualify for the 2002 FIFA World Cup on aggregate.

== Births ==
- 1 January – Angourie Rice, actress
- 3 April – Sophie Delezio, high-profile victim of a childcare accident
- 6 April – Oscar Piastri, motor racing driver
- 1 June – Ed Oxenbould, actor
- 27 November – Morgana Davies, actress

== Deaths ==
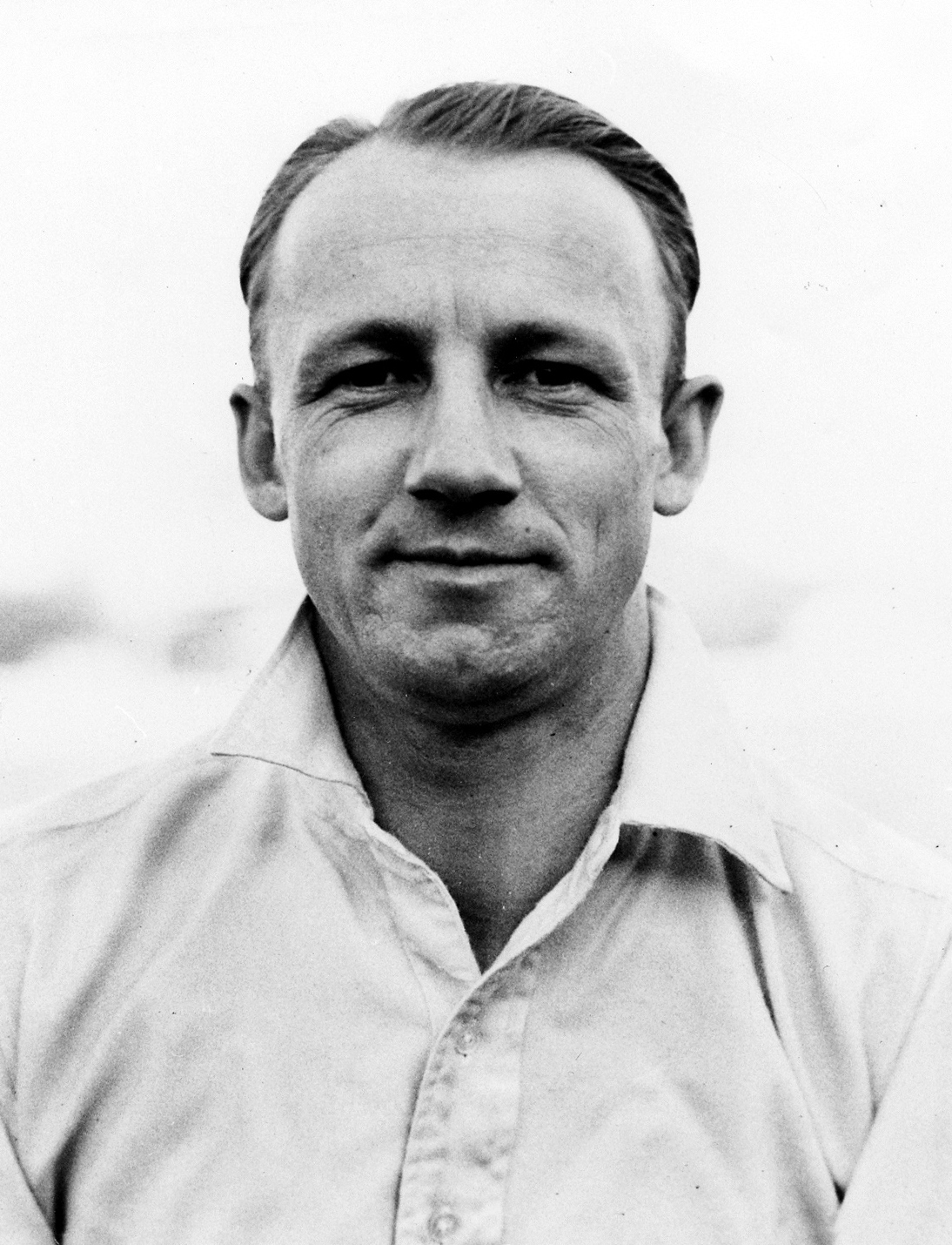
Sir Donald Bradman

- 26 January – Jessica Michalik, asphyxiation victim (b. 1985)
- 25 February – Sir Donald Bradman, cricketer and businessman (b. 1908)
- 10 March – Sir Michael Woodruff, surgeon and scientist (born and died in the United Kingdom) (b. 1911)
- 10 May – Sir Arthur Tange, public servant (b. 1914)
- 19 June – Robert Klippel, artist and sculptor (b. 1920)
- 5 August – Christopher Skase, businessman and fugitive (died in Spain) (b. 1948)
- 29 August – Graeme "Shirley" Strachan, singer and television presenter (b. 1952)
- 1 September – Fos Williams, Australian rules footballer and coach (b. 1922)
- 18 September – David McNicol, public servant and diplomat (d. 1913)
- 3 November – Evan Adermann, Queensland politician (b. 1927)

== See also ==
- 2001 in Australian television
- List of Australian films of 2001
