= List of WACE courses =

The list of WACE courses is a list of the courses available to complete the Western Australian Certificate of Education.

== Courses ==
These were the courses available in 2009.

=== Format ===
Subject code is "Stage number + unit letter + course code".
Examples:

- Stage 3 mathematics unit C = 3CMAT
- Stage 1 physical education studies unit A = 1APES

Course Code	Course Title	Available Units
AIS	Aboriginal and Intercultural Studies	1A/1B, 2A/2B, 3A/3B
ABL	Aboriginal Languages of Western Australia	1A/1B, 2A/2B, 3A/3B
ACF	Accounting and Finance	1A/1B, 2A/2B, 3A/3B
ALB	Albanian	2A/2B, 3A/3B
HIA	Ancient History	1A/1B, 2A/2B, 3A/3B
APS	Animal Production Systems	PA/PB, 1A/1B, 1C/1D, 2A/2B, 3A/3B
AIT	Applied Information Technology	PA/PB, 1A/1B, 1C/1D, 2A/2B, 3A/3B
ARA	Arabic	2A/2B, 3A/3B
ARM	Armenian	2A/2B, 3A/3B
AUS	Auslan	2A/2B, 3A/3B
VAU	Automotive^{a} (VET industry specific)	1A/1B, 1C/1D, 2A/2B
AET	Automotive Engineering and Technology	1A/1B, 1C/1D, 2A/2B, 3A/3B
AVN	Aviation	1A/1B, 2A/2B, 3A/3B
BIO	Biological Sciences	1A/1B, 2A/2B, 3A/3B
BOS	Bosnian	2A/2B, 3A/3B
BCN	Building and Construction	PA/PB, 1A/1B, 1C/1D, 2A/2B, 3A/3B
BME	Business Management and Enterprise (2010 and onwards)	PA/PB, 1A/1B, 1C/1D, 2A/2B, 3A/3B
VBS	Business Services^{a} (VET industry specific)	1A/1B, 1C/1D, 2A/2B, 2C/2D
CAE	Career and Enterprise	1A/1B, 1C/1D, 2A/2B, 3A/3B
CHE	Chemistry	1A/1B, 2A/2B, 3A/3B
CFC	Children, Family and Community	PA/PB, 1A/1B, 1C/1D, 2A/2B, 3A/3B
CBS	Chinese: Background Speakers	2A/2B, 3A/3B
CSL	Chinese: Second Language	1A/1B, 2A/2B, 3A/3B
VCS	Community Services^{a} (VET industry specific)	1A/1B, 1C/1D, 2A/2B, 2C/2D
CSC	Computer Science	1A/1B, 2A/2B, 3A/3B
VCO	Construction^{a} (VET industry specific)	1A/1B, 1C/1D, 2A/2B
VCA	Creative Industries: Art^{a} (VET industry specific)	1A/1B, 1C/1D, 2A/2B, 2C/2D
VME	Creative Industries: Media^{a} (VET industry specific)	1A/1B, 1C/1D, 2A/2B, 2C/2D
CRO	Croatian	2A/2B, 3A/3B
DAN	Dance	1A/1B, 2A/2B, 3A/3B
DES	Design	PA/PB, 1A/1B, 1C/1D, 2A/2B, 2C/2D
DRA	Drama	1A/1B, 2A/2B, 3A/3B
DUT	Dutch	2A/2B, 3A/3B
EES	Earth and Environmental Science	1A/1B, 2A/2B, 3A/3B
ECO	Economics	1A/1B, 2A/2B, 3A/3B
EST	Engineering Studies	1A/1B, 2A/2B, 3A/3B
ENG	English	PA/PB, 1A/1B, 1C/1D, 2A/2B, 2C/2D, 3A/3B
ELD	English as an Additional Language/Dialect	1A/1B, 1C/1D, 2A/2B, 3A/3B
FIL	Filipino	2A/2B, 3A/3B
FST	Food Science and Technology	PA/PB, 1A/1B, 1C/1D, 2A/2B, 3A/3B
FRE	French	1A/1B, 2A/2B, 3A/3B
GEO	Geography	1A/1B, 2A/2B, 3A/3B
GER	German	1A/1B, 2A/2B, 3A/3B
HEA	Health Studies	PA/PB, 1A/1B, 1C/1D, 2A/2B, 3A/3B
HEB	Hebrew	2A/2B, 3A/3B
HIN	Hindi	2A/2B, 3A/3B
VHO	Hospitality^{a} (VET industry specific)	1A/1B, 1C/1D, 2A/2B
HBS	Human Biological Science	1A/1B, 2A/2B, 3A/3B
HUN	Hungarian	2A/2B, 3A/3B
IBS	Indonesian: Background Speakers	2A/2B, 3A/3B
IND	Indonesian: Second Language	1A/1B, 2A/2B, 3A/3B
VIT	Information Technology^{a} (VET industry specific)	1A/1B, 1C/1D, 2A/2B, 2C/2D
ISC	Integrated Science	PA/PB, 1A/1B, 1C/1D, 2A/2B, 3A/3B
ITA	Italian	1A/1B, 2A/2B, 3A/3B
JBS	Japanese: Background Speakers	2A/2B, 3A/3B
JSL	Japanese: Second Language	1A/1B, 2A/2B, 3A/3B
KHM	Khmer	2A/2B, 3A/3B
LIT	Literature	1A/1B, 1C/1D, 2A/2B, 3A/3B
MAC	Macedonian	2A/2B, 3A/3B
MBS	Malay: Background Speakers	3A/3B
MAL	Maltese	2A/2B, 3A/3B
MMT	Marine and Maritime Technology	1A/1B, 1C/1D, 2A/2B, 3A/3B
MDT	Materials, Design and Technology	PA/PB, 1A/1B, 1C/1D, 2A/2B, 3A/3B
MAT	Mathematics	PA/PB, 1A/1B, 1C/1D, 1E; 2A/2B, 2C/2D, 3A/3B, 3C/3D
MAS	Mathematics Specialist	3A/3B, 3C/3D
MPA	Media Production and Analysis	1A/1B, 1C/1D, 2A/2B, 3A/3B
GRE	Modern Greek	2A/2B, 3A/3B
HIM	Modern History	1A/1B, 2A/2B, 3A/3B
MUS	Music	PA/PB, 1A/1B, 1C/1D, 2A/2B, 3A/3B
OED	Outdoor Education	PA/PB, 1A/1B, 1C/1D, 2A/2B, 3A/3B
PBS	Persian Background Speakers	3A/3B
PAE	Philosophy and Ethics	1A/1B, 2A/2B, 3A/3B
PES	Physical Education Studies	PA/PB, 1A/1B, 1C/1D, 2A/2B, 3A/3B
PHY	Physics	1A/1B, 2A/2B, 3A/3B
PPS	Plant Production Systems	PA/PB, 1A/1B, 1C/1D, 2A/2B, 3A/3B
POL	Polish	2A/2B, 3A/3B
PAL	Politics and Law	1A/1B, 2A/2B, 3A/3B
POR	Portuguese	2A/2B, 3A/3B
VPI	Primary Industries^{a} (VET industry specific)	1A/1B, 1C/1D, 2A/2B
PSY	Psychology	1A/1B, 2A/2B, 3A/3B
PUN	Punjabi	2A/2B, 3A/3B
REL	Religion and Life	PA/PB, 1A/1B, 1C/1D, 2A/2B, 3A/3B
ROM	Romanian	2A/2B, 3A/3B
RUS	Russian	2A/2B, 3A/3B
RBS	Russian Background Speakers	3A/3B
SER	Serbian	2A/2B, 3A/3B
SIN	Sinhala	2A/2B, 3A/3B
SPA	Spanish	2A/2B, 3A/3B
SWE	Swedish	2A/2B, 3A/3B
TAM	Tamil	2A/2B, 3A/3B
VTO	Tourism^{a} (VET industry specific)	1A/1B, 1C/1D, 2A/2B
TUR	Turkish	2A/2B, 3A/3B
UKR	Ukrainian	2A/2B, 3A/3B
VIE	Vietnamese	2A/2B, 3A/3B
VAR	Visual Arts	1A/1B, 1C/1D, 2A/2B, 3A/3B
WPL	Workplace Learning	1A/1B, 1C/1D
YID	Yiddish	2A/2B, 3A/3B

^a A successful result in this course may result in a nationally recognised qualification (see VET)

== VET ==
Some WACE units may contribute to, or result in a nationally recognised qualification.

Unit Codes	Resulting Qualification Code	Resulting Qualification^{b}
1AVAU & 1BVAU	AUR10105	Certificate I in Automotive
1CVAU, 1DVAU, 2AVAU and 2BVAU	AUR20705 or AUR20505	Certificate II in Automotive
1AVCS & 1BVCS	CHC10102	Certificate I in Work Preparation
1CVCS & 1DVCS, or 2AVCS & 2BVCS	CHC20202	Certificate II in Community Service Work
1CVCS, 1DVCS, 2AVCS and 2BVCS	CHC30402	Certificate III in Children's Services

^b See 'Registered training organisation' for more information.

== Units ==
The units are organised into stages based on level of difficulty. This means 'P', the preliminary stage, is the easiest, through to 'Stage 3' which is the hardest. Since a school year in Western Australia is usually about 40 weeks, and a WACE unit is 16 weeks long, units are usually grouped together and taught together. This can be done concurrently (Both units taught in a mix) or separately (one unit in semester one, and one unit in semester two).

== See also ==
- Curriculum Council
- WACE
