= Natashia =

Natashia is a given name. Notable people with the name include:

- Natashia Boland (born 1967), Australian mathematician
- Natashia Deón (born 1978), American novelist, attorney, and activist
- Natashia Holmes (born 1975), American politician
- Natashia Williams (born 1978), American actress

== See also ==
- Natasha, given name
