= Toowoomba Airport =

Toowoomba Airport may refer to:

- Toowoomba City Aerodrome, a smaller older airport in Wilsonton
- Toowoomba Wellcamp Airport, a larger newer airport in Wellcamp
