= Applecross Senior High School =

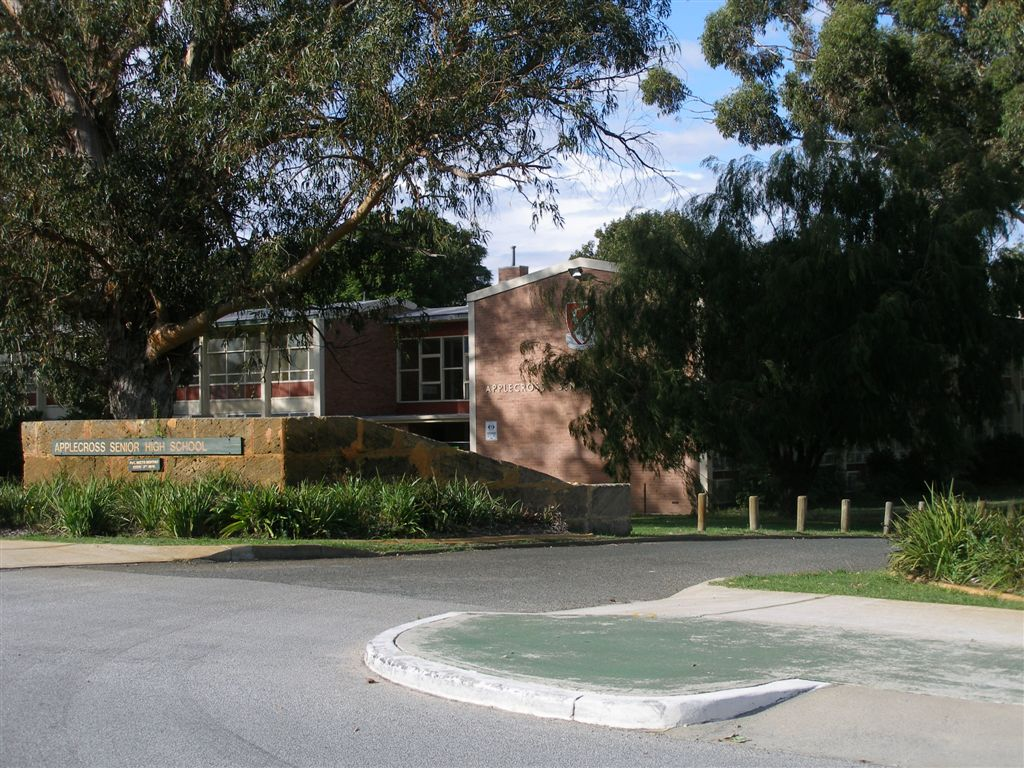
- Applecross Senior High School in 2006

Location
- Ardross, Perth, Western Australia; Australia; 32°01′46″S 115°50′05″E

Information
- Type: Public co-educational high school
- Motto: Achieve
- Established: 1958; 68 years ago
- Educational authority: WA Department of Education
- Principal: Angie Thomas
- Enrolment: 1,962 (Semester 2, 2025)
- Campus type: Suburban
- Colours: Black, green, red and white
- Website: www.applecross.wa.edu.au

Applecross Senior High School is a public co-educational high school, located in Ardross, a southern suburb of Perth, Western Australia.

Founded in 1958, Applecross Senior High School has traditionally been one of the leading public high schools in Western Australia and consistently ranks academically within the top ten secondary schools in the state. Applecross has produced two Rhodes Scholars.

Applecross runs dedicated art, tennis and chess programs, and has traditionally been dominant in these areas. It also runs Academic Extension classes, for those students talented in the areas of English, Maths, Science, Society and Environment, French and Japanese.

Like many Western Australian high schools, Applecross is a partially selective high school with out-of-area students accepted on a number of criteria.

== History ==
The school was opened in 1958 to service the rapidly growing south-of-the-river suburbs of the city of Perth. As of 2021, 1731 students from Years 7 to 12 attended the school.

In 2009 the Government of Western Australia allocated A$56 million for the re-development of the school. A competitive tender process was completed in April 2010. The original school 'H' block, science block, swimming pool, and the 1970s gymnasium was retained. All other existing buildings were removed. A new south wing on the site of the existing tennis courts was designed to house a new administration area, library, resource centre, science, home economics and health and physical education wings. A new design, and technology centre was constructed to the east of the swimming pool and a new visual arts centre was located on the site of existing basketball courts. The gymnasium was converted into a performing arts centre, while the original 'H' block was refurbished for use by business/information technology, careers and vocational education, English, languages, mathematics, society and environment and student services.

== School crest ==
The school crest is a combination of a black swan holding a book, signifying proximity to the Swan River, with a hand holding a scimitar, emerging from a five-pointed crown ("issuant from an eastern crown or, a dexter hand holding a scimitar, in fess all proper"), the crest of the Chief of the Matheson clan. Sir Alexander Matheson Bt of Lochalsh, a property developer who in 1897 initiated the subdivision of the suburb of Applecross, became Chief of the Clan in 1920 on the death of his brother, the 2nd Baronet.

== Academic ranking ==
The Year-12 cohort at Applecross perform consistently well in the WACE school rankings, and the school ranks well when compared to other schools in Western Australia.

WA school ATAR ranking

Year	Rank	Median ATAR	Eligible students	Students with ATAR	% students with ATAR	Notes
2017	25	86.15	229	158	69.00	
2016	24	85.10	237	175	74.76	

Year 12 student achievement data

Year	Rank (Note: Ranking of school compared to other schools in the state)	% +75 in WACE (Note: Based on the number of Stage 3 course enrolments in the school where a WACE course score of 75 or above was achieved)	Rank	% +65 in WACE (Note: Based on the number of Stage 3 course enrolments in the school where a WACE course score of 65 or above was achieved)	% graduates (Note: Percentage of Year 12 cohort that graduated with a WACE certificate)	Notes
2015	33	13.54	28	39.05	97.71	
2014	>50	<10.03	40	34.94	100	
2013	41	10.98	46	31.75	100	
2012	>50	<9.88	45	35.64	100	
2011	35	13.54	41	44.68	97.51	
2010	33	13.22	48	43.61	98.47	
2009	26	38.54 (>75% minimum of one subject)	25	44.39 (64.6% or more)	98.42	

Beazley Medals

- 2014: Robert Rubery won the Beazley Medal for the top ranked Vocational Education & Training (VET) student.
- 1993: Bertrand Sze Yu Lee won the Beazley Medal for the top ranked TEE student.

== Controversies ==
The school has come under fire for resorting to debt collectors to recover unpaid school fees in a move which Pania Turner, president of WA Council of State School Organisations, considered an "extreme option" only to be used as a last resort.

== Notable alumni ==
- Dean Alston – Walkley Award winning newspaper cartoonist
- Tony Ayres – film director
- Marcus Beilby – Realist painter, winner of Sir John Sulman Prize
- Darren Bennett – former Australian Rules football player and American football punter in the NFL
- Jenny Boult (1951–2005) – author and poet, won 1981 Anne Elder Award for first book of poetry
- Jim Gill AO – Chancellor of Curtin University, Western Australia (2010–2012), former: CEO of WA Water Corporation; WA Commissioner of Railways
- Jillian Green – artist whose work is held in many major Western Australian institutions
- Jeanette Hacket AM – Vice-Chancellor of Curtin University, Western Australia (2006–2013)
- Adele Horin (1951–2015) – Walkley Award-winning columnist and reporter for The Sydney Morning Herald, previously international correspondent for the National Times.
- Peter Lewis AM – former Australian Consul-General and Senior Trade Commissioner in San Francisco
- Bill Louden – Senior Deputy Vice-Chancellor (2009–2013) and Dean of Education (2006–2008) of University of Western Australia
- Vince Lovegrove (1947–2012) – journalist, music manager, television producer, musician
- Raoul Marks – dual Emmy Award winner for main title design on True Detective and The Man in the High Castle
- Vinay Menon – Rhodes Scholar 2012, John Monash Scholar
- Steve Pennells – journalist, 5-time Walkley Award winner including Gold Walkley in 2012, 18 WA Media Awards
- Graeme Robertson – Rhodes Scholar 1971, former: Director of Muresk Institute of Curtin University; Director-General of WA Department of Agriculture
- Diane Stone – professor in Politics and International Studies at the University of Warwick, UK and Professor in Public Policy at Central European University in Budapest.
- Lesley Vidovich – Winthrop Professor, Graduate School of Education, University of Western Australia
- Reece Waldock – Director General of WA Department of Transport, Commissioner for Main Roads, CEO of Public Transport Authority of Western Australia. Former WA Commissioner of Railways
- Steve Ward – boat builder; built 1983 12-metre class America's Cup winner Australia II, and challengers Australia, Australia III, Australia IV, Challenger 12 & South Australia.
- Bruce Williams – Commissioner of Fair Work Australia, former Commissioner of the Australian Industrial Relations Commission, Perth

== See also ==
- List of schools in the Perth metropolitan area
