= KSHS =

KSHS may refer to:

- Kansas State Historical Society
- Kalamunda Senior High School
- Kelmscott Senior High School
- Kentucky Historical Society
- Kaohsiung Municipal High School
- King Solomon High School
- Kingdom of Serbs, Croats and Slovenes (Serbo-Croatian Latin: Kraljevina Srba, Hrvata i Slovenaca)
- Kesteven and Sleaford High School
