= Marcus Beilby =

Australian realist painter

Marcus Charles Beilby
- Born: 20 November 1951 (age 74); Perth, Western Australia
- Education: Claremont Technical College
- Known for: Painting
- Notable work: Crutching the Ewes, Opening of Parliament House by Her Majesty Queen Elizabeth II on 9 May 1988
- Style: Photorealism
- Awards: 1987 Sir John Sulman Prize for Australian Genre Painting
- Website: marcusbeilby.com

Marcus Charles Beilby (born 20 November 1951, in Western Australia), is an Australian realist painter. Beilby grew up in the Perth suburb of Mount Pleasant. He was educated at Applecross Senior High School and the Claremont Technical College, where he received a Diploma of Fine Arts (Painting) in 1975.

Beilby was the winner of the 1987 Sir John Sulman Prize for Australian Genre Painting. The winning painting, Crutching the ewes has been described as a homage to Tom Roberts' Shearing the Rams.

In 1988, Charles Bush received a royal commission from Her Majesty Queen Elizabeth II to depict the inauguration of the permanent Parliament House. Bush died the next year, leaving behind an initial sketch. As a result, Marcus Beilby was chosen to finalize the artwork and carry out the completion of the painting.

He currently resides in East Fremantle, Western Australia.

His father was the noted Australian author and novelist Richard Beilby.

== Collections ==
- Australian War Memorial
- High Court of Australia
- The State Art Collection, The Art Gallery of Western Australia
- National Gallery of Victoria
- National Library of Australia
- Castlemaine Art Museum
