= James Albert Miles =

James Albert Miles (1871 – 1953) was a senior inspector of schools in Western Australia in the early 20th century.

During the early decades of the 20th century, the district school in Duke Street, Toodyay played an important part in the history of education in Western Australia. This was due to the influence of James Miles, an educational reformer who selected Toodyay as a "country observation school", and to be a prototype for the type of school he believed should be established in rural areas. As a result of his influence Toodyay achieved a number of firsts in Western Australia: the first country observation school, the first consolidated school, the first in the Special Rural Schools programme, and the first to establish what became the Parents and Citizens Association.

Miles was a strong-minded man who, having achieved academically in New South Wales, believed in his worth as an innovative educator. His career path was not always smooth when his ideas met with Departmental opposition along the way.

James Albert Miles was born in Ballarat, Victoria in 1871. He began his teaching career in NSW as a pupil-teacher before being awarded a scholarship to the Teachers' College in Sydney. While at the College he gained his matriculation, and enrolled part-time at the University of Sydney. He graduated in Arts, in 1894 having studied logic, mental philosophy and education psychology. In 1899, after teaching at various schools, he accepted an appointment as head teacher at the school in Guildford, Western Australia.

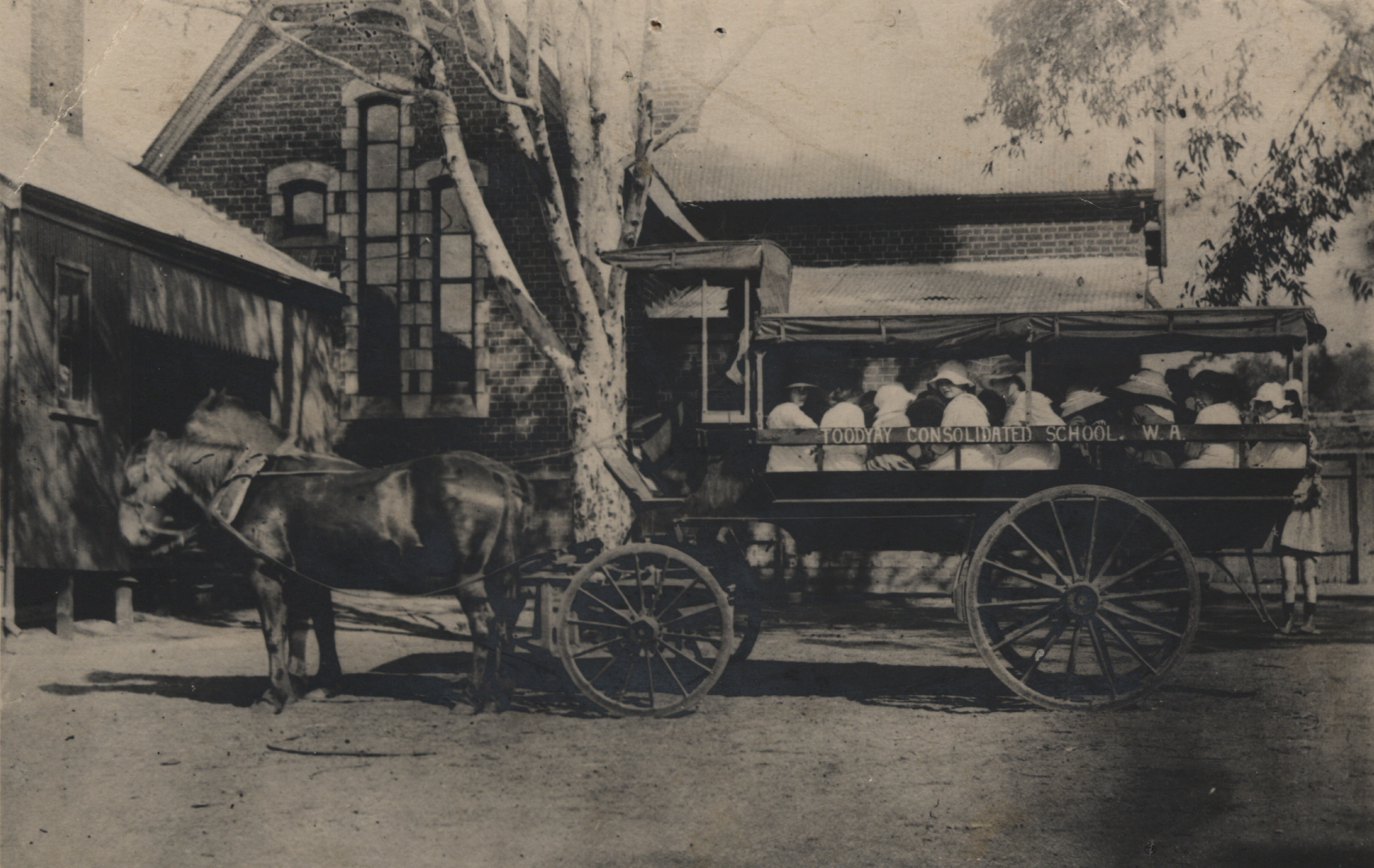
Toodyay Consolidated School 1920

When Miles arrived in Western Australia, he reported to Cyril Jackson, the inspector-general of schools. Miles greatly admired Jackson, and said that he was "the greatest educational leader under whom I had ever served". Miles achieved good results at Guildford and after postings at various schools, including North Fremantle, West Leederville, and Subiaco, he was promoted to head teacher at Perth Boys School, became school inspector in 1911 and eventually a senior inspector of schools in 1913 with a special interest in rural education.

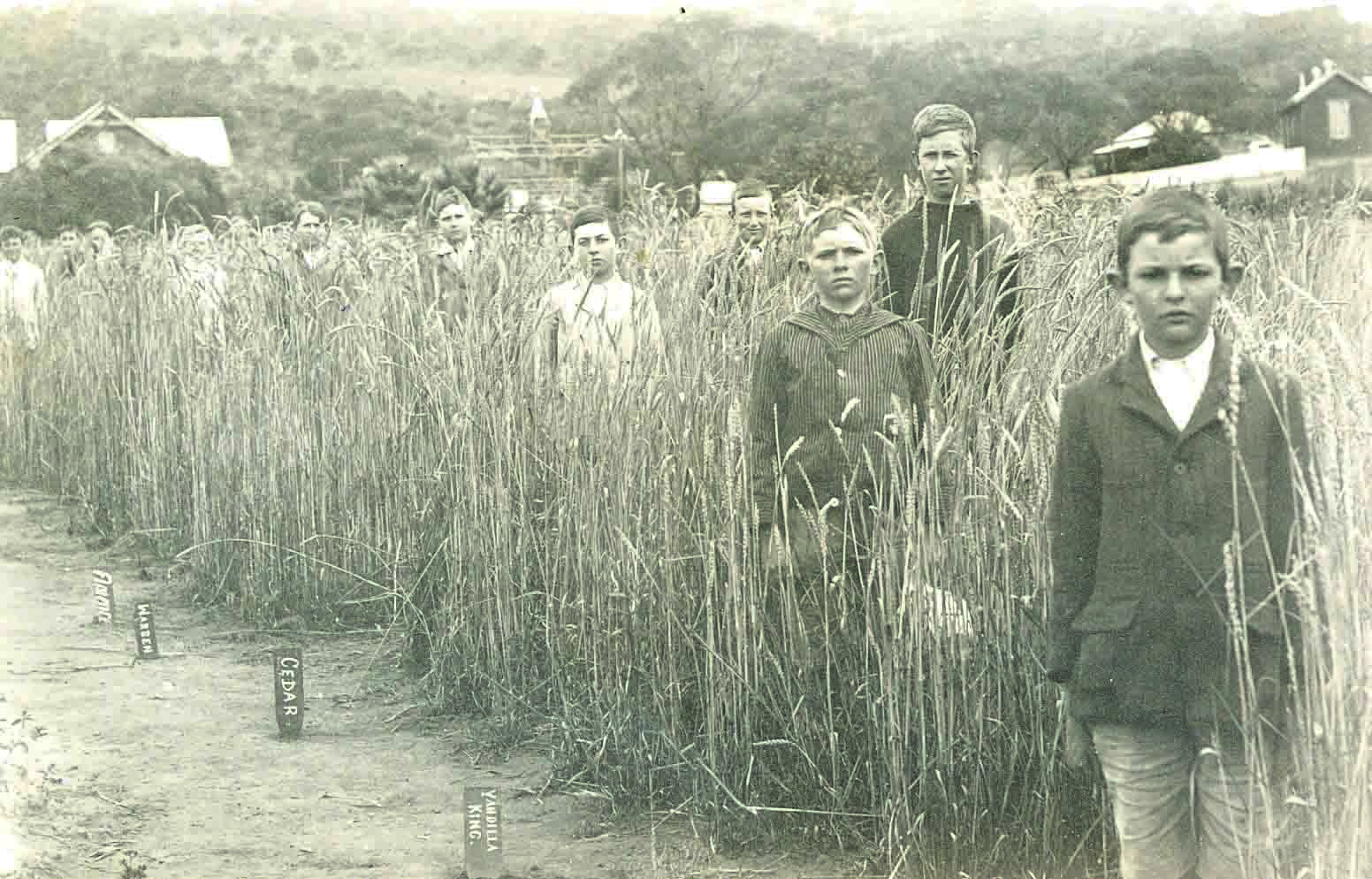
Wheat plot & students at Duke St School Toodyay 1920s

In 1915 Miles chose Toodyay to be the pioneer of his Special Rural Schools programme. To this end he worked with the headmaster Roderick Brooke Cowden and his staff to design the equipment needed to enable the students to be more independent and resourceful in the learning process. Subjects were to be based on the practical activities of farming life. School gardens were established where the children experimented with different types of grains such a wheat, oats and barley, and the growing of vegetables and flowers. Girls were taught fruit and vegetable preservation, and first aid. When teaching standard curriculum subjects such as arithmetic and history, teachers were encouraged to use local sources, for example "figures showing the district's imports and exports were computed from the railway records". By 1920 twelve other special rural schools were established in the state. This number would peak at 40 in 1922. This success was in no small part due to the government's recognition of the state's dependence on agriculture. The commissioners of the Royal Commission into Education 1921 visited Toodyay and were highly impressed with its programme.

In 1929 the first field day for the Government School Experimental Plots was held; it attracted large crowds of farmers and parents. Schools also started competing with displays at the annual Perth Royal Show in Claremont. These were popular events.

Following a tour in 1920 to study rural schools in North America, Miles introduced the idea of consolidating outlying one-teacher schools into a central school. Toodyay was selected, with 26 students from West Toodyay being brought into town by a horse-drawn van. On 12 November 1920 the Minister for Education, Hal Colebatch came to Toodyay to officially open the first consolidated school. "Thus began a movement that was to eliminate nearly all of the state's one-teacher-schools by the early 1960s."

Miles' other major achievements included the establishment of correspondence classes in 1918 and a revised primary school curriculum in 1936.

Miles retired in 1936. He died on 27 April 1953, at his Claremont home.
