= Curriculum Council of Western Australia =

The Curriculum Council of Western Australia is a defunct government department that once set curriculum policy directions for kindergarten to year 12 schooling in Western Australia. It was located at 27 Walters Drive, Osborne Park, Western Australia 6017. The Curriculum Council was governed by the Curriculum Council Act 1997.

Set up in 1997, the council was disbanded following a litany of failures in 2012. It was replaced by the School Curriculum and Standards Authority.

The goal of the Curriculum Council was to provide for the development and implementation of a Curriculum Framework for schooling which sets out the knowledge, understandings, skills, values and attitudes that students are expected to acquire; provides for the development and accreditation of courses of study for post-compulsory schooling; and provides for the assessment and certification of student achievement.

== Principles ==
Student learning is the major stated principle of the curriculum. The curriculum policy directions are underpinned by the following stated principles:

- an encompassing view of the Curriculum (K-12);
- a recognition of the significance of learning outcomes;
- fair and explicit standards;
- inclusivity;
- an agreed set of values;
- consultative and transparent decision making processes;
- collaboration with stakeholders.

== History ==
Paul Albert was appointed as the inaugural Chief Executive of the Curriculum Council by the then Education Minister, Colin Barnett, shortly after the formation of the Council in 1997 when it superseded the Secondary Education Authority. Albert was appointed on a five-year contract, and left the Council in 2001, leaving Norma Jeffery as the CEO.

Norma Jeffery was appointed as Chief Executive of the Council in 2003. Jeffery was responsible for the implementation of the Curriculum Framework and in 2005 began to introduce the new courses of study into Year 11 of senior high schools in Western Australia under the direction of the then Education Minister Ljiljanna Ravlich.

Jeffery commissioned a report on the assessment scheme that was to be used in the controversial system of outcomes based education from Professor David Andrich, the Dean of Education at Murdoch University in 2005. The report was duly completed later the same year and found that strongly argued case for marks arising from analytic assessments to be used for tertiary selection and against the levelling system that was currently being used. Consequently, Jeffery was removed from her position and transferred elsewhere in the public service and replaced by Greg Robson. Robson left shortly afterward accepting a position in the Department of Education in South Australia.

David Axworthy, who was appointed as the acting Chief Executive of the Curriculum Council in 2005, announced in July 2006 that he would not continue in the position. This followed widespread opposition to the introduction of the state's ill-conceived outcomes based education system into the school system that Axworthy was in charge of. As a result, the Council was going to have to find its fourth Chief Executive in twelve months.

Dave Wood was appointed to the role of Chief Executive of the Curriculum Council in 2006, in the midst of a furore of the botched introduction of Outcomes Based Education in schools in Western Australia.

In 2009 the Council miscalculated final scores for students who had completed practical tests for three courses.

The Chief Executive of the Curriculum Council, Dave Wood, was dumped in 2010 by the then education minister, Liz Constable, following a string of errors being identified in the WACE examinations from 2010. The minister stated that serious problems with the Year 12 examinations were the reason Woods' contract was not renewed. Errors had been identified in the History, Physics, Maths, English and Business Management and Enterprise exams, evidence of failures in the Council's proof-reading processes.

Some of the mistakes included a Physics question where the incorrect unit of measurement was used, a History exam where an image was labelled 1915 instead of 1925., a Mathematics exam where an incorrect answer had been given in an example question, a Music exam where questions were asked that were not in the subject syllabus. Other more serious blunders by the Council included a printing error in an Economics exam where questions from the History course had been included and an exam supervisor allowing students to use notes when they were not supposed to.

In another instance of outright incompetence a Food Science and Technology exam had to be rewritten after it had been displayed on the Council web-site for two days.

The Council claimed that the mistakes were the result of budget cuts, although its budget had actually increased from A$7 Million in 2007 to A$14 million in 2010.

Both the Council charmain, Professor Bill Louden, and the Chief Executive, Dave Wood, were reprimanded by the then Minister of Education, Liz Constable after she had expressly asked them to recheck all papers after initial errors were discovered.

Further problems occurred in 2011 when complaints about the Chemistry exam made by teachers concerned that a large proportion of the exam had been devoted to an obscure part of the course. Also the exam had asked for an essay to be written on a topic when the exam design brief specified that only short paragraph style answers were required. The current acting Chief Executive, Allan Blagaich, claimed that the exams did fit the design brief. Additional complaints were also made about the Modern History and the English exam.

The Curriculum Council was disbanded in 2012 and replaced by the new School Curriculum and Standards Authority, to be chaired by Patrick Garnett.
