= Adele Horin =

Australian journalist (1951–2015)

- Born: Adele Marilyn Horin; 25 January 1951; Perth, Western Australia
- Died: 21 November 2015 (aged 64); Sydney, New South Wales
- Education: Applecross Senior High School; University of Western Australia (BA)
- Occupations: Journalist and columnist
- Writing career
- Notable awards: Walkley Award (1981)

Adele Marilyn Horin (25 January 1951 – 21 November 2015) was an Australian journalist. She retired in 2012 as a columnist and journalist for The Sydney Morning Herald. A prolific and polarising writer on social issues, she was described as "the paper's resident feminist".

== Life and career ==
=== Early life ===
Born at St Anne's Hospital, Mt Lawley in 1951, Horin grew up in Applecross, Western Australia, a suburb of Perth. Educated at Applecross Primary School and Applecross Senior High School, she began her journalistic career as a cadet at The West Australian newspaper, while earning a Bachelor of Arts degree part-time at the University of Western Australia.

=== Career ===
Horin worked as a correspondent in New York, initially for The Australian Women's Weekly and Cleo magazines, and then for The Sydney Morning Herald. She later worked in Washington, New York and London covering politics, society and economics for The National Times newspaper, considered in its day to be a pioneering exponent of investigative and social issues journalism. In Australia, after a period with the ABC Radio National Life Matters programme she joined The Sydney Morning Herald. She had a Saturday column on the paper's Comment page. Normally taking a left wing view point, Horin's writing usually dealt with social issues.

In 2010 Stephanie Brown's portrait of Adele Horin was selected for the Archibald Prize Salon des Refusés.

In her column on 25 August 2012, Horin announced her retirement from The Sydney Morning Herald "not to spend the day in a dressing gown but to think, write, participate, and to engage with my generation in a different way".

=== Death ===
On 15 November 2015, Horin announced via her blog the return of lung cancer, which had been treated aggressively the year before. She indicated she was too unwell to continue to write. She died on 21 November 2015, aged 64.

=== Legacy ===
The annual Adele Horin Prize is awarded to an exceptional woman journalism student from the University of Technology Sydney and includes $5,000 and an internship with Guardian Australia. Past winners have included Stephanie Tran and Rafqa Touma.

== Awards ==
- 1981 - Received a Walkley Award (Print) for Best Feature in a Newspaper or Magazine, at The National Times, Sydney, for a series of articles about sex in Australia. She was a Walkley Award finalist again in 1996 and 2008.
- 1991 - Won the Australian Human Rights Commission Metropolitan Newspapers Award for her weekly column My Generation.
- 1999 - Was a finalist for Strewth! magazine's Earnest Bastard of the Year Award.
- 2011 - Received an Australian Human Rights Commission media award for Sad truth behind closed doors, a series of stories on abuse and neglect of people with disability living in licensed boarding houses.
