= Churchlands Senior High School =

Public high school in Western Australia

Location
- Churchlands; Western Australia; Australia; 31°55′03″S 115°47′21″E

Information
- Type: Independent Public co-educational high school
- Motto: Aim High & Achieve
- Established: 1962; 64 years ago
- Educational authority: WA Department of Education
- Principal: Neil Hunt
- Staff: 205.7 (10 May 2024)
- Years: 7–12
- Enrolment: 2,357 (10 May 2024)
- Campus type: Suburban
- Colours: Teal; Navy blue Red; Gold
- Website: www.churchlands.wa.edu.au

Churchlands Senior High School is an independent public secondary school located in Churchlands, a suburb of Perth, Western Australia, approximately eight kilometres (five miles) northwest from the Perth central business district. It is one of the largest schools in Western Australia, with 2,357 enrolled students as of 10 May 2024.

== Background and history ==
Churchlands Senior High School (Churchlands SHS) is a co-educational high school for Year 7 to Year 12. The school is located in Perth's western suburbs, three kilometres (two miles) from the Indian Ocean and eight kilometres (five miles) from the city centre.

On 6 November 1991, a female student was murdered in class when she was stabbed 18 times by her ex-boyfriend.

On 26 May 1997 the majority of the school was burnt down in a failed attempt to destroy evidence of a break-in. The school was largely rebuilt after spending a few years using demountable classrooms.

On 14 August 2008 the administration block was badly damaged by fire as a result of arson, and demountable offices were brought in to the school. The time taken for refurbishment from the time of the fire until completion was over 13 months.

In 2011 Churchlands SHS joined the Education Department's Independent Public Schools programme.

Churchland SHS is a music school and has both GATE and IMMS programs.

== Academic status ==
Churchlands Senior High School students have received many major awards including three Beazley Medals. For the 2009 TEE, Churchlands was the highest ranked public school, based on the number of students who scored 75% or more over four subjects. For the 2008 TEE, Churchlands was the second-highest ranked public school, based on the number of students who scored 75% or more over four subjects.

=== WA school ranking ===
Year	Rank	Median ATAR	Eligible students	Students with ATAR	% students with ATAR	Notes
2018	29	85.05	352	250	71.02	
2017	23	86.6	336	226	67.26	
2016	28	84.7	346	271	78.32	

=== Year 12 student achievement data ===
Year	Rank (Note: Ranking of school compared to other schools in the state)	% +75 in WACE (Note: Based on the number of Stage 3 course enrolments in the school where a WACE course score of 75 or above was achieved)	Rank	% +65 in WACE (Note: Based on the number of Stage 3 course enrolments in the school where a WACE course score of 65 or above was achieved)	% graduates (Note: Percentage of Year 12 cohort that graduated with a WACE certificate)	Notes
2015	28	14.48	31	38.06	0.00	
2014	16	50.39	14	68.89	99.29	
2013	14	17.61	17	43.48	96.85	
2012	14	20.20	16	49.18	98.70	
2011	11	22.87	15	56.86	100	
2010	17	18.57	20	58.12	97.1	
2009	10	50.99 (>75% minimum of one subject)	6	63.36 (64.6% or more)	97.88	

Beazley Medal academic winners

Each year, a Beazley Medal is presented to the top ranked academic student in Western Australia. Churchlands Senior High School recipients have been:

- 2009: Hayley Anderson
- 1992: Jonathon Robert Leslie Paget
- 1989: Howard Ho-Wah Yip

== Music ==
Churchlands Senior High School's Gifted and Talented music program has run sincere 1972. Facilities include a 504-seat acoustically engineered concert hall, a music auditorium seating 254, a dedicated choral studio and with instrumental practice rooms. International recognition includes the attainment of honours at the Llangollen International Musical Eisteddfod in Wales and at the World Music Festival in Geneva. Student musicians perform for audiences in Australia and overseas with three-yearly tours to Europe, Asia and North America.

Ensemble performance is an integral part of the Churchlands music experience, and the performing ensembles include choirs, concert bands, orchestras, chamber groups, and guitar ensembles. To enter any level of the music program students must complete tests and auditions. Those who win a place in the program undertake an intensive course that is both practical and theoretical.

== Enrolment patterns ==
Churchlands SHS is one of the largest school in Western Australia, with 2,215 students in 2026. Churchlands had 34 temporary transportable classrooms in 2018 to accommodate increasing student enrolment. The creation in 2020 of Bob Hawke College, 5 km (3.1 mi) away in Subiaco, was intended to decrease pressure on Churchlands and other schools in the western suburbs.

Enrolment patterns 2001-2015
	Year 7	Year 8	Year 9	Year 10	Year 11	Year 12	Totals
2001		238	216	265	290	279	1,288
2002		249	256	235	301	284	1,325
2003		242	270	285	288	244	1,353
2004		305	253	291	299	255	1,403
2005		361	318	295	318	280	1,572
2006		346	389	338	295	282	1,650
2007		357	355	397	365	290	1,764
2008		319	370	366	422	320	1,797
2009		298	320	385	374	389	1,766
2011		294	128	312	356	361	1,451
2012		360	302	139	324	328	1,453
2013		348	368	312	155	301	1,483
2014		353	360	378	330	145	1,566
2015	421	412	364	373	390	309	2,269

== Notable alumni ==
=== Government ===
- Kerry Sanderson – Governor of Western Australia, CEO of Fremantle Ports (1991–2008)
- Eric Ripper – Deputy Premier and WA Treasurer 2001–2008, Leader of the Opposition in Western Australia 2008–2012

=== Academia and science ===
- Natashia Boland – Mathematician
- Aron Chakera – Rhodes Scholar
- Mike Fitzpatrick – Rhodes Scholar
- Andrew Poole – cave diver & explorer, co-discovered longest cave in Indonesia, and co-discovered the remipede species L. exleyi in a sink hole near Exmouth
- Ian Puddey – Emeritus Professor, School of Medicine and Pharmacology, University of Western Australia

=== Art, entertainment and media ===
- Linda May Han Oh - Bassist, Grammy Award Winner

- Taryn Fiebig – soprano, Opera Australia
- Conor Barton – drummer, Mosquito Coast, Winner of Triple J Unearthed High 2015
- Sally Carbon – radio host, journalist, and children story-book writer
- Neil Eliot (1955–2007) – press photographer, Walkley Award 1991 and Press Photograph of the Year 1992
- Neil Fisenden – flautist, Adelaide Symphony Orchestra and West Australian Symphony Orchestra
- Christopher Malcolm – art curator, Director of the John Curtin Gallery
- Allan Myers – clarinetist, Adelaide Symphony Orchestra and West Australian Symphony Orchestra
- Michael Turkic – actor, director, and producer of musical theatre
- Christine Turpin – timpanist, Melbourne Symphony Orchestra

=== Business ===
- Mike Fitzpatrick – Director, Rio Tinto
- John Gillam – Chairman Officeworks, CEO Bunnings, Director CSR
- Melanie Greensmith – fashion designer, co-founder Wheels and Doll Baby
- Peter Stirling – Corporate lawyer and Partner, King & Wood Mallesons

=== Sport ===
- Neil Brooks – swimming, Moscow Olympics 1980 gold medal 4 × 100 m medley relay, Los Angeles Olympics 1984 silver medal 4 × 100 m medley relay, bronze medal 4 × 100 m freestyle relay
- Calvin "C.J." Bruton – basketballer, Australian Boomers, Brisbane Bullets NBL
- Sharon Buchanan – hockey, Los Angeles Olympics 1984, Seoul Olympics 1988 gold medal, Barcelona Olympics 1992, Hockeyroos Captain
- Sally Carbon – hockey, Seoul Olympics 1988 gold medal
- Mike Fitzpatrick – VFL footballer, Carlton premiership captain 1981 & 1982, captained Victoria 1982, Chairman of the AFL Commission
- Richard Hardwick – rugby, Wallabies, Western Force
- Maddison Keeney – diving 3m synchronised springboard, bronze medal Rio de Janeiro Olympics 2016 and silver medal Paris Olympics 2024
- Richard Pengelley - water polo, Los Angeles Olympics 1984 and Seoul Olympics 1988
- Shannon Reynolds – canoe sprint K4 500, Tokyo Olympics 2020
- Tom Stachewicz – swimming, Los Angeles Olympics 1984, Seoul Olympics 1988, Barcelona Olympics 1992 – Swimming Western Australia Hall of Fame 2009
- Christine Stanton – high jumper, Moscow Olympics 1980, Los Angeles Olympics 1984, Seoul Olympics 1988
- Sidney Stephens – freestyle skier, 2026 Winter Olympics
- David Watts – rowing, Rio de Janeiro Olympics 2016
- Sam Welsford – cycling men's 4000m team pursuit, silver medal Rio de Janeiro Olympics 2016

== See also ==
- List of schools in the Perth metropolitan area
