= Balcatta Senior High School =

High school in Perth, Western Australia

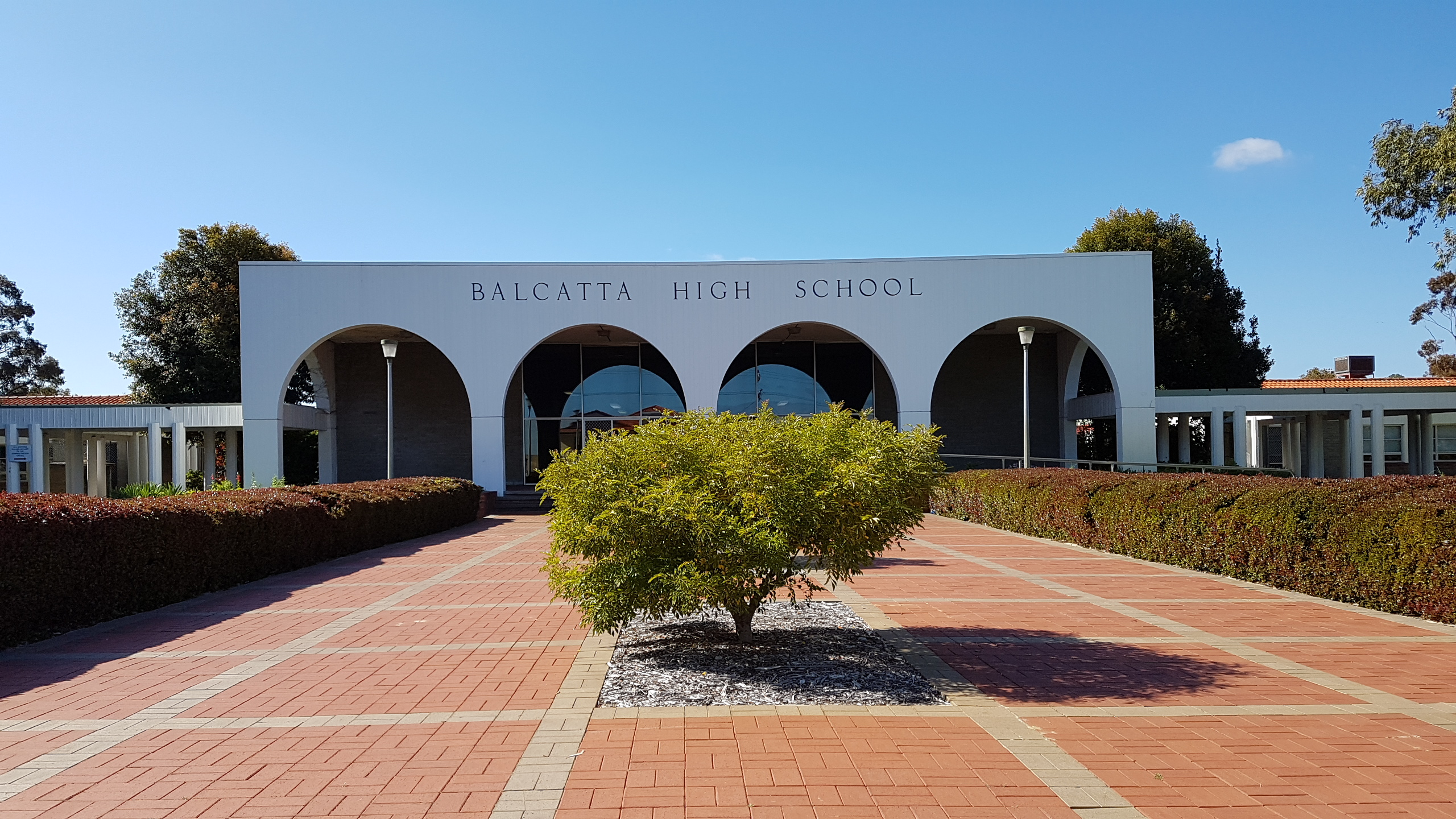
- Southern entrance of Balcatta Senior High School in 2017

Location
- Balcatta, Perth, Western Australia; Australia; 31°52′32″S 115°48′46″E

Information
- Type: Independent public co-educational high school
- Motto: Building the Future
- Established: 1967; 59 years ago
- Educational authority: WA Department of Education
- Principal: Helen Maitland
- Years: 7–12
- Enrolment: 611 (2017)
- Campus type: Suburban
- Colours: Navy, red and white
- Website: www.balcattashs.wa.edu.au

Western Australia Heritage Register
- Designated: 18 November 2011
- Reference no.: 9812

Balcatta Senior High School is an independent public co-educational high school, located on Poincaire Road in Balcatta, approximately 10 kilometres (6.2 mi) north of Perth, Western Australia.

== History ==
The school was established in 1967 and caters for students from Year 7 to Year 12.

In 2003 the school won the inaugural Institute of Chartered Accountants Award in Australia’s Great Student Debate.

== Catchment area ==
Balcatta's catchment area has been specified by the WA Department of Education to include all or parts of the following suburbs: Balcatta, Gwelup, Nollamara, Stirling and Westminster. Some areas are able to attend Carine Senior High School or the Western Suburbs Secondary Schools Cluster. Balcatta's feeder primary schools are Balcatta, Takari and West Balcatta. Lake Gwelup and Osborne primary students most feed to Balcatta but some are eligible to attend either Balcatta or Mirrabooka Senior High School.

== Notable alumni ==
- Johnny Ruffo – a singer-songwriter and dancer; contestant in the third Australian season of The X Factor; participated in the Australian 2012 season of Dancing with the Stars
- Shaun Tan – animator; 2011 Academy Award winner for The Lost Thing

== See also ==
- List of schools in the Perth metropolitan area
