= Natashia Boland =

Mathematician, professor

- Born: 1967 (age 58–59); Perth, Western Australia
- Education: University of Western Australia
- Occupation: Mathematician

Natashia Lesley Boland (born 1967) is a professor of mathematics at Georgia Institute of Technology. Boland completed a PhD at the University of Western Australia in 1992, and afterwards she pursued postdoctoral research at the University of Waterloo in Canada, at the Georgia Institute of Technology in the USA. She spent 13 years at the University of Melbourne and then from 2008 to 2014 worked at the University of Newcastle. She has made contributions to transportation scheduling, modeling of infrastructure networks, planning pricing strategies for demand, and optimization for environmental modeling.

== Early life and education ==
Boland was influenced as a child by construction toys, and demonstrated an early aptitude for mathematics by reading through the entire year's curriculum during a two-week break for illness. She also cites the inspiration of two teachers, Mrs. Martini in second grade and Janet Hunt at Churchlands High School. She also attended a math camp at the National Mathematics Summer School in Canberra.

Boland pursued degrees in both mathematics and computer science at the University of Western Australia. She at first hated computer science, but later began to love it as she realized how intertwined mathematics and computers were. For her honours degree, Boland studied robotics. Boland completed her PhD in 1992 under the supervision of Alistair Iain Mees, and took two postdoctoral fellowships at the University of Waterloo in Canada and at the Georgia Institute of Technology.

== Awards ==
In 2013, Boland delivered the Hanna Neumann Lecture to honour the achievements of women in mathematics. In 2013, Boland was also awarded a Biennial Medal of the Modelling and Simulation Society of Australia and New Zealand.

== Selected publications ==
- Wallace, Mark; Boland, Natashia; Burke, Edmund (2013). "Transport scheduling: Meeting the challenges of scale, complexity and uncertainty". Computers & Operations Research. 40 (3): 655–656. doi:10.1016/j.cor.2012.10.011.
- Boland, Natashia; Kalinowski, Thomas; Kaur, Simranjit (2015). "Scheduling network maintenance jobs with release dates and deadlines to maximize total flow over time: Bounds and solution strategies". Computers & Operations Research. 64: 113–129. arXiv:1406.5562. doi:10.1016/j.cor.2015.05.011. S2CID 39136444.
- Talebian, Masoud; Boland, Natashia; Savelsbergh, Martin (2014). "Pricing to accelerate demand learning in dynamic assortment planning for perishable products". European Journal of Operational Research. 237 (2): 555–565. doi:10.1016/j.ejor.2014.01.045.
