= Harrisdale Senior High School =

School in Perth, Western Australia

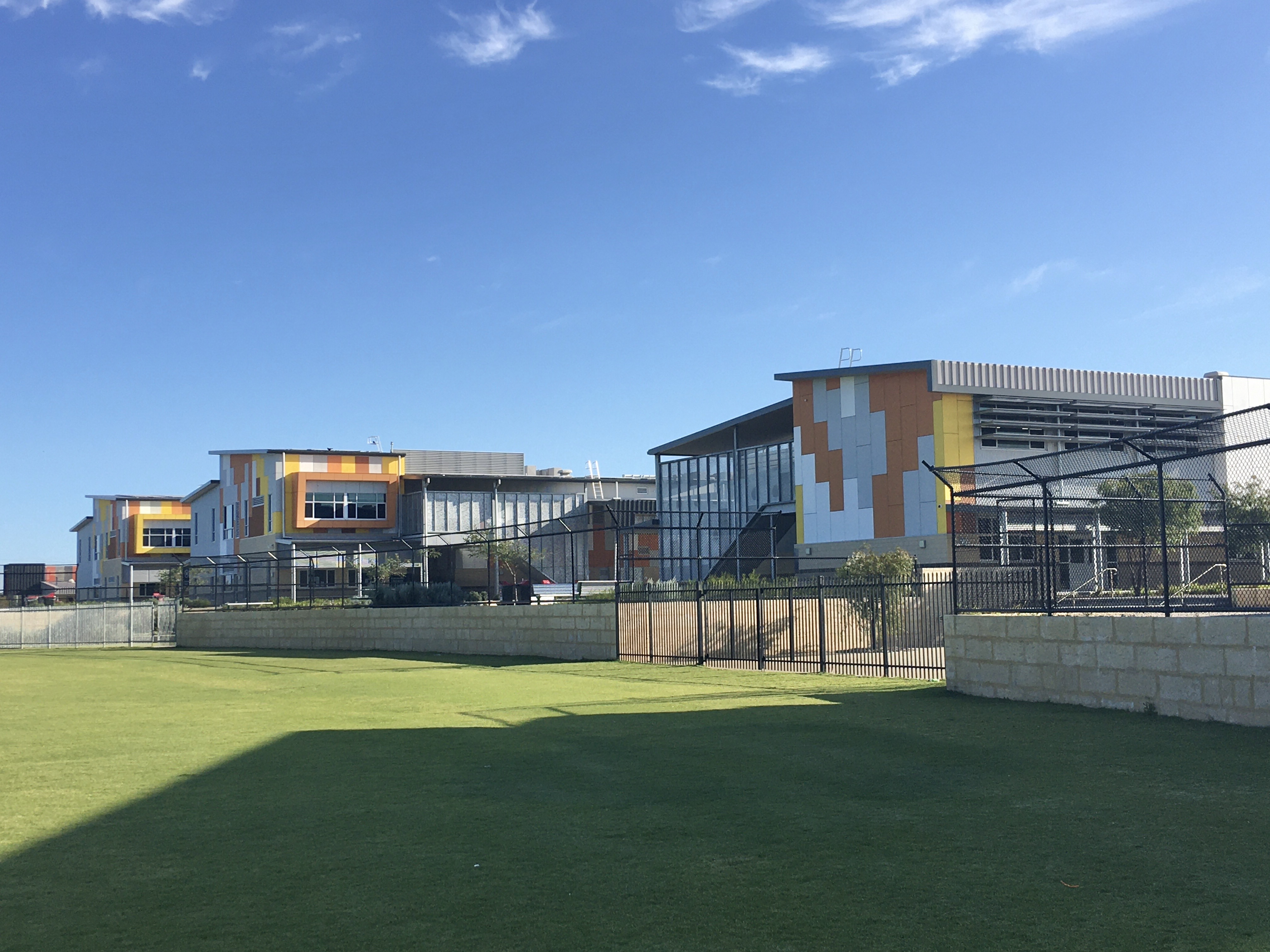
- Harrisdale Senior High School viewed from school oval in December 2021

Location
- 1 Laverton Crescent; Harrisdale, Western Australia; Australia; 32°07′45″S 115°56′01″E

Information
- Type: Independent public co-educational day school
- Motto: Excellence in Learning and Teaching
- Opened: 2017; 9 years ago
- Educational authority: WA Department of Education
- Principal: Mr Mark Millard
- Years: 7–12
- Enrolment: 2303 (2025)
- Campus type: Suburban
- Colour
- Website: harrisdaleshs.wa.edu.au

Harrisdale Senior High School is an Independent Public secondary school in the City of Armadale, located at Laverton Crescent in Harrisdale, a suburb 21 kilometres (13 mi) south of Perth, Western Australia.

== Overview ==
Harrisdale Senior High School opened at the start of the 2017 school year. The school's name bucked the trend of new public secondary schools in Western Australia having "College" in their name. The principal stated that the community chose the name as the school "wanted to be easily recognised as the public school in an area that had a number of private colleges".

In February 2020, the second and final stage of construction of Harrisdale Senior High School opened. Additions in this stage included 30 classrooms, three seminar rooms, specialist facilities for visual art, media and dance, a lecture theatre and a hockey pitch.

In 2021, Harrisdale Senior High School commenced a Gifted and Talented (GAT) program, one of only 24 such programs in Western Australia. The program is open to 32 students in each year. Sue Ellery, the state's Minister for Education stated that the government wanted schools offering GAT programs to be evenly spread across Perth. At the time, there was a large share of GAT schools in the inner metropolitan region.

== See also ==
- List of schools in the Perth metropolitan area
