= Jillian Green =

Australian artist (born 1975)

Jillian Frances Green
- Born: 1975 (age 50–51)
- Known for: Painting; Iconography
- Website: jilliangreen.com

Jillian Frances Green (born 1975) is an Australian artist, whose work references Christian art, particularly illuminated manuscripts and Russian iconography. Her studies and work reflect this continuing interest in philosophical and theological writings. She sees the detailed beautification of sacred texts as an act of meditative worship, and her work is that act, too.

In her 2016 solo exhibition, "Vessels", at the Turner Galleries in Perth, she used her knowledge of icon painting to paint portraits in the style of Russian icons on empty pots (vessels), where the emptiness of the pot represented the "receptiveness of the sitter.... to the divine". Her 2010 exhibition, "black stone white stone", takes its name from the tale of a Buddhist monk who puts stones of these colours in his pockets throughout the day to give the daily count good bad things done or thought, and shows the evidence of her walking the Camino de Santiago de Compostela through Spain in 2007, with her work also referencing Muslim art (as did her 2007 exhibition "Blue Stone").

== Collections ==
Her work is held in the National Gallery of Australia (3 works), and the Lawrence Wilson Art Gallery at the University of Western Australia. It is also found in the collections of many Western Australian institutions, for example: Edith Cowan University, the Royal Perth Hospital, Saint John of God Health Care hospitals/institutions, the King Edward Hospital and the Sir Charles Gairdner Hospital.
