= Eastland Air =

IATA	ICAO	Call sign
DK	ELA	—
- Commenced operations: 1991
- Ceased operations: 2003
- Fleet size: See Fleet below
- Destinations: See Destinations below
- Headquarters: Toowoomba, Queensland, Australia

Eastland Air was an airline based in Toowoomba, Queensland, Australia. The airline started passenger operations in 1991 and ceased in 2003.

== Destinations ==
- Queensland
  - Brisbane
  - Cunnamulla
  - St George
  - Thargomindah
  - Toowoomba
- New South Wales
  - Moree

== Fleet ==
At various stages during its time in operation, Eastland Air operated the following aircraft types;

- Beech 200 Super King Air
- Beech C90 King Air
- de Havilland DHC-6-200 Twin Otter
- Piper PA-31
- Fairchild SA-227 Metroliner

== Accidents and incidents ==
- On 27 November 2001, a Beech C90 King Air operated by Eastland Air crashed after take-off at Toowoomba Aerodrome killing the pilot and three members of the Queensland government's mental health team.

== Code data ==
- IATA Code: DK
- ICAO Code: ELA

== See also ==
- List of defunct airlines of Australia
- Aviation in Australia
