= Tertiary Entrance Exam =

School examination in Western Australia

The Tertiary Entrance Examination (TEE) was the standard academic examination for secondary students completing their twelfth year of schooling in Western Australia from 1986 to 2009. The TEE replaced the Tertiary Admission Examination (TAE) which ran from 1975 to 1985, and prior to 1975 the matriculation examinations. TEE results were used to determine the Tertiary Entrance Rank and the Tertiary Entrance Score. These metrics were used to determine eligibility for entrance to the tertiary institutions in the state.

In 2010, the Western Australian Certificate of Education (WACE) was introduced as an umbrella term given to the set of final examinations that are completed by the majority of Year 12 students, replacing the TEE (Tertiary Entrance Exam). All previous TEE courses and corresponding examinations were converted to the WACE curriculum, and the TER (Tertiary Entrance Rank) was replaced with the Australian national standard entrance score, the ATAR.

== Tertiary Entrance Rank (TER) ==
The TER was normally derived from the Tertiary Entrance Score (TES) by a mathematical procedure approved by the Academic Board. For applicants who took university entrance qualifications equivalent to the TEE in another state of Australia, in New Zealand or who obtained the International Baccalaureate Diploma, a TER was also derived. In the latter cases, the TER was considered equivalent to the TER derived from Western Australia's TES.

The TER was a number between 99.95 and zero that reported a student's ranking in comparison to all other students.

The TER (Tertiary Entrance Rank) was replaced by an Australian national standard entrance score, the ATAR, in 2010.

== Tertiary Entrance Score (TES) ==
In 2008, the TES was a score out of 510 (during 2009, out of 400), calculated on the basis of a person's TEE exam results.

Previously, the TES was calculated by multiplying an applicant's best mean scaled score over four or five Tertiary Entrance subjects, with at least one subject from each of List 1 and List 2 contributing to the score, by 5.1. Prior to 1998, 500 marks came from the average of a minimum of 4 subjects, while the remaining 10 came from the Australian Scholastic Aptitude Test (ASAT) score. In 2006, the first of the Course of Studies (COS), Aviation was allowed as a TEE Subject and the first external exam was performed, although the average exam mark was an appalling 36%. In 2007, three other COS's will be externally examined upon for the first time; English COS (replacing English TEE Subject), Engineering Studies and Media, Production and Analysis. In 2008 the TES was calculated on an applicant's best four TEE subjects, abolishing the previous list 1/ list 2 approach, however all candidates still had to complete 2 units of TEE English or English literature.

The TEE and COS subjects are broken into 2 lists; List 1-Humanities and List 2-Quantitative. If a student wants to qualify for a TER, they must pick at least 4 subjects, with at least one subject from List One and at least one subject from List Two.

List 1

- Ancient History
- Art
- Chinese: Advanced
- Chinese: Second Language
- Drama Studies
- Economics
- English (COS)
- English Literature
- French
- Geography
- German
- Hebrew
- History
- Indonesian: Advanced
- Indonesian: Second Language
- Italian
- Japanese: Advanced
- Japanese: Second Language
- Latin
- Malay: Advanced
- Media Production and Analysis (COS)
- Modern Greek
- Music
- Philosophy and Ethics
- Political and Legal Studies

List 2

- Accounting
- Applicable Mathematics
- Aviation (COS)
- Biology
- Calculus
- Chemistry
- Discrete Mathematics
- Geology
- Engineering Studies (COS)
- Human Biology
- Information Systems
- Physical Science
- Physics
