= Kalamunda Senior High School =

Public high school in Western Australia

Location
- Kalamunda, Perth, Western Australia; Australia; 31°58′41″S 116°03′27″E

Information
- Type: Public co-educational high day school
- Motto: Wisdom and Courage
- Established: 1960; 66 years ago
- Educational authority: WA Department of Education
- Principal: Helen Deacon
- Years: 7–12
- Enrolment: c. 1,133 (2018)
- Campus type: Suburban
- Website: kalamundashs.wa.edu.au

Kalamunda Senior High School is a public co-educational high day school, located in the Perth suburb of Kalamunda, Western Australia.

Kalamunda Senior High School offers enrolment for students from Year 7 to Year 12. Additionally the school offers various specialist programs which include:

- Gifted and Talented Visual Arts Program
- Academic Excellence Program
- Outdoor Adventure Program
- Performing Arts Program (General and Music streams)

== Notable alumni ==
Karl O'Callaghan – Commissioner of WA police from 2004 to 2017.

== See also ==
- List of schools in the Perth metropolitan area
