= Toowoomba City Aerodrome =

Airport in Queensland, Australia

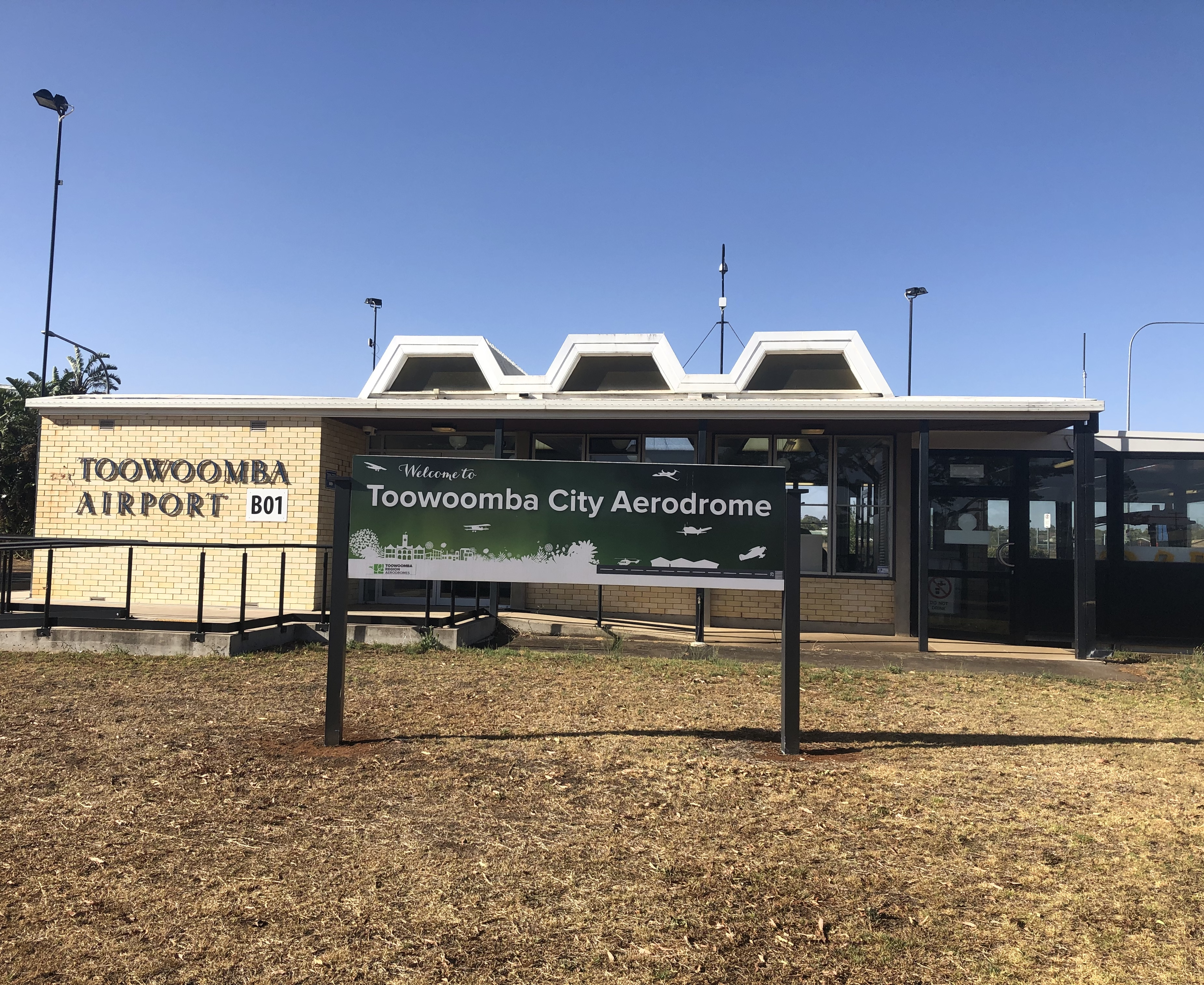
- IATA: TWB; ICAO: YTWB

Summary
- Airport type: Public
- Operator: Toowoomba Regional Council
- Location: Toowoomba, Queensland
- Elevation AMSL: 2,086 ft / 636 m
- Coordinates: 27.541°S 151.913°E

Map
- Location in Queensland

Runways
Direction	Length		Surface
Direction	m	ft	Surface
06/24	660	2,165	Grass
11/29	1,341	4,400	Asphalt
- Sources: Australian AIP and aerodrome chart

Toowoomba City Aerodrome (IATA: TWB, ICAO: YTWB), known as Toowoomba Aerodrome until 2015, is an airport located 2.2 nautical miles (4.1 km; 2.5 mi) northwest from the CBD of Toowoomba, Queensland, Australia.

Toowoomba City Aerodrome is both licensed and certified, being owned and operated by Toowoomba Regional Council. A certified airfield, Toowoomba City Aerodrome is able to operate airlines and larger charter aircraft, as well as being licensed and regulated by federal transport security laws. Toowoomba City Aerodrome does not have a control tower; however the airfield is regulated and operated under Civil Aviation Safety Authority (CASA) regulations of aviation operations at non-tower controlled aerodromes.

== History ==
A Qantas flight between Brisbane and Toowoomba was the first unsubsidised passenger service in Australia. A regular daily service commenced on 9 May 1928 with a de Havilland DH.50.

Toowoomba was used briefly for international flights. Qantas's second international airmail flight passed through Toowoomba in December 1934. In February 1935, it was still in use for airmail and passenger flights, but in May 1935, it was decided not to enlarge the airport as it was no longer used for airmail flights and it would not be needed for Qantas flights from Brisbane to Singapore.

Several notable people have landed in Toowoomba. Bert Hinkler, born in Bundaberg, Queensland, was another pioneer aviator. In February 1928, he flew the first solo flight from England to Australia in his Avro Avian G-EBOV. Hailed as a hero, he travelled around Australia where he was met by huge crowds. On 16 June 1928 Hinkler landed in Toowoomba at the Clifford Park racecourse flying G-EBOV. On 29 May 1930, the first woman to fly from England to Australia, Amy Johnson, landed at what was then known as the Werrington Park Aerodrome or the Wilsonton Aerodrome. In August 1932, Sir Charles Kingsford Smith, a pioneer Australian aviator, landed at Toowoomba in his Fokker Trimotor named the 'Southern Cross'. It was in this plane that he made the first non-stop flight across the Australian continent and the first flight across the Tasman Sea to New Zealand.

Between 1939 and 1945, the airfield was used at various times by Defence Assets with the cooperation of its owner, Mr. Rankin. In January 1944, the Royal Australian Air Force's (RAAF) Directorate of Works and Building (DWB) prepared the airfield for a flight of No 5 Army Co-op Squadron in its move to Toowoomba. The unit was quartered and its CAC Wirraways were dispersed in trees across the Western Highway some 200–300 m (660–980 ft) north of the Wilsonton Post Office and 500–600 m (1,600–2,000 ft) north of the present runway location.

In June 1946, the Darling Downs Aero Club was formed on the grass paddock at Wilsonton by a small yet eager group of pilots. Initially, it operated only on the weekends (out of a borrowed tent), and flying training was conducted for and on behalf of the club by the Royal Queensland Aero Club (Archerfield).

Toowoomba City Aerodrome has been subject to much debate from the 1960s to present, with conjecture centred on development of the existing site versus a new green-field development. In the 1960s the Mayor of Toowoomba, Jack McCafferty, expressed interest in upgrading the airport and extending the runway; however these proposals were met with opposition from within the council. In the intervening years, several developments near the airport boundary were allowed, effectively confining the airport and limiting expansion options. Development was spurred on by Council business surveys conducted in 2009 that suggested there was sufficient traffic to sustain both direct Brisbane and Sydney flights.

In 2010, the Toowoomba Region secured funding from the Queensland Government allowing a A$10 million (A$13,246,614 as of 2022) expansion of the Wilsonton site. The works involved an extension of the main runway to the east, within the confines of the existing airport boundaries. Additional ramp space was provided for passenger aircraft parking; however the terminal was building itself was not renovated or updated. Earthworks were completed by July 2011, but unfavourable weather delayed surfacing works.

The commencement of Skytrans Dash-8 services from Brisbane to Western Queensland via Toowoomba demonstrated that regional turbo-prop aircraft could operate from the airport with a low noise footprint. In July 2011, local media reported that Skytrans was interested in expanding its network to include Toowoomba to Sydney services, while Council suggested that there may a case for direct flights to regional centres such as Newcastle, Gold Coast, Moree or Charleville.

In the same month, the Queensland Government released a statewide infrastructure review. This identied the need for a larger airport with a runway capable of handling commercial jets to support regional development in the Toowoomba, Darling Downs and Surat Basin regions. Despite a number of green field sites to the south and south west of Toowoomba having been considered, the expense of building such a facility was beyond the means of the Toowoomba Region and would require investment by federal or state Government. The Army Aviation Centre in nearby Oakey was also considered unsuitable due to the volume of military traffic and conflicts between training areas and approach and departure paths required for large jets. In addition, significant investment would be required to improve road access to Toowoomba and supporting infrastructure at Oakey Airport.

Following the opening of the privately funded Toowoomba Wellcamp Airport, regional services operated under contract to the Queensland Government were transferred to Wellcamp on 1 January 2015. This left Toowoomba City Aerodrome without any regular passenger services. No scheduled services currently operate from Toowoomba City Aerodrome.

== Category and frequencies ==
- CTAF(R) 127.65 (Adjacent to Oakey Control Zone)
- NDB 386
- AWIS 127.05
- BN CEN 121.2
- PAL 122.4

== Other users ==
- Darling Downs Aero Club
- Aerotec Queensland – restoration of Warbirds and historic aircraft
- LifeFlight
- Royal Flying Doctor Service
- Toowoomba City Airport Services

== Incidents and accidents ==
- On 27 November 2001, a Beechcraft King Air C90 (registration VH-LQH) operated by Eastland Air on a charter flight to Goondiwindi crashed shortly after takeoff from runway 29. It was ultimately determined that the left engine lost power just as, or shortly after, the aircraft became airborne. The pilot continued the take off, however the aircraft could not gain altitude and crashed into a nearby industrial estate. All persons on board (the pilot and three passengers) were killed in the accident. No injuries were reported on the ground. The cause was ultimately determined to be a combination of maintenance and operational issues. The ATSB also noted that the characteristics of the placement and design of runway 29 were a possible contributing factor, due to the limited margin for runway overrun in case of an aborted take off.

== See also ==
- List of airports in Queensland
- Toowoomba Wellcamp Airport
