= Deputy premiers of the Australian states =

The deputy premiers of the Australian states are the second-most senior officers in the governments of the individual states of Australia. The position is generally filled by either the deputy leader of the governing party or the leader of the second-largest party in a governing coalition.

In Australia's two self-governing territories, the Australian Capital Territory and the Northern Territory (and previously also in Norfolk Island), the equivalent position is the deputy chief minister.

== Duties ==
The duties of the deputy premier are to act on behalf of the premier when the premier is overseas or on leave. The deputy premier is always a member of the cabinet, and always holds at least one substantive portfolio, although it is technically possible for the deputy premier to hold only that title.

If the premier were to die, become incapacitated, or resign, the state governor would normally appoint the deputy premier as premier on an interim basis. Should a different leader be chosen by the party, that person would then be appointed premier.

== Deputy premiers of the Australian states ==
In each state, the title "deputy premier" saw a long period of informal use before being created as a formal position.

- Deputy Premier of New South Wales (established 1932)
- Deputy Premier of Queensland (established 1974)
- Deputy Premier of South Australia (established 1968)
- Deputy Premier of Tasmania (established 1958)
- Deputy Premier of Victoria (established 1932)
- Deputy Premier of Western Australia (established 1955)

== Deputy chief ministers of the Australian territories ==
In each self-governing Australian territory, the position of deputy chief minister has existed since the advent of self-government.

- Deputy Chief Minister of the Australian Capital Territory (established 1989)
- Deputy Chief Minister of the Northern Territory (established 1974)
- Deputy Chief Minister of Norfolk Island (established 1979; abolished 2015)
