= Western Australian Certificate of Education =

School qualification offered in Western Australia

- Acronym: WACE
- Administrator: School Curriculum and Standards Authority
- Purpose: Assessment of final two years of schooling for Western Australian students, ranking students for university entry
- Score range: Individual WACE courses: 0 to 100, in one point increments; ATAR: below 30.00 to 99.95, in 0.05 point increments
- Offered: Once every year
- Regions: Western Australia
- Languages: English
- Used by: Tertiary Institutions Service Centre, Universities in Australia
- Website: senior-secondary.scsa.wa.edu.au/the-wace

The Western Australian Certificate of Education (WACE) is the credential awarded to students who have completed senior secondary education (Year 10, Year 11 and Year 12) in the state of Western Australia. It is the Western Australian graduation certificate of the Australian Senior Secondary Certificate of Education. Students are required to meet various breadth and depth requirements, achievement standards and literacy and numeracy standards across their final years of schooling. As of the 2020 WACE, there are 106 courses available for students to study. Many WACE students are awarded an Australian Tertiary Admission Rank (ATAR), summarising their results across all areas of study into one ranking for the purposes of university admission. Students may choose from ATAR courses, which count directly towards their ATAR, Vocational Education and Training courses, which are more practical courses and can lead to further vocational opportunities, and, from 2021, General courses, which provide pathways to university, employment, or further vocational education and training. From 2010, the WACE replaced the Tertiary Entrance Exam (TEE), as the standard academic examination for school leavers in Western Australia.

== Requirements ==
As of 2020, for students to attain the WACE, they must meet requirements in breadth and depth of study, minimum achievement standards, and minimum literacy and numeracy standards.

To meet the breadth and depth requirements, students must study at least 20 units, including 10 units of Year 12 courses; four units of English at a post-Year 10 level (i.e. across years 10, 11 and 12), including a pair of units at Year 12 level; and a pair of Year 12 units from both List A, which consists of humanities subjects and List B, made up of STEM subjects. Subjects generally have four units studied across two years. Units 1 and 2 are generally studied in Year 10 and 11, and units 3 and 4 are generally studied in Year 12.

The achievement standards require C grades, which signify "satisfactory achievement", or better, in at least fourteen units across both Year 11 and Year 12 units, including C grades or better in at least six Year 12 units. For Vocational Education and Training (VET) courses, completing all the requirements of a course is equivalent to a C grade for this purpose. Students must also complete at least four Year 12 courses or at least a Certificate II VET qualification, as per the Australian Qualifications Framework. The VET option may be met by partially completing a Certificate III or higher qualification.

Students have various opportunities to meet the required minimum literacy and numeracy standards. Students may pre-qualify by achieving Band 8 results in the Year 9 National Assessment Program – Literacy and Numeracy (NAPLAN). To demonstrate literacy standards, this score must be achieved in the reading and writing components of NAPLAN, and for numeracy, this must be met in the numeracy component. If students do not reach the required minimum standard, they have a potential six attempts before completing Year 12 (two per year each in Years 10, 11 and 12) to pass the Online Literacy and Numeracy Assessment (OLNA) to meet the requirements. The OLNA is available in both literacy and numeracy, and students who have pre-qualified in one learning area only need to sit the OLNA for the learning area in which they have not pre-qualified. Students may also sit the OLNA after finishing school at any age to attain the minimum literacy and numeracy standard for the WACE.

== Available courses ==
As of 2020, there are 106 available WACE courses.

=== List A courses ===
- Aboriginal and Intercultural Studies
- Ancient History
- Business Management and Enterprise
- Career and Enterprise
- Children, Family and the Community
- Dance
- Drama
- Economics
- English
- English as an Additional Language or Dialect
- Geography
- Health Studies
- Literature
- Media Production and Analysis
- Modern History
- Music
- Philosophy and Ethics
- Politics and Law
- Religion and Life
- Visual Arts

=== List B courses ===
- Accounting and Finance
- Animal Production Systems
- Applied Information Technology
- Automotive Engineering and Technology
- Aviation
- Biology
- Building and Construction
- Chemistry
- Computer Science
- Design
- Earth and Environmental Science
- Engineering Studies
- Food Science and Technology
- Health, Physical and Outdoor Education
- Human Biology
- Integrated Science
- Marine and Maritime Studies
- Materials Design and Technology
- Mathematics: Mathematics, Applications, Essential, Methods, Specialist
- Outdoor Education
- Physical Education Studies
- Physics
- Plant Production Systems
- Psychology

=== Language courses (also part of List A) ===
- Aboriginal Languages of Western Australia
- Arabic
- Armenian
- Auslan
- Bosnian
- Chin Hakha
- Chinese: BL, FL, SL
- Croatian
- Dutch
- Filipino
- French: BL, SL
- German: BL, SL
- Hebrew
- Hindi
- Hungarian
- Indonesian: FL, SL
- Italian: BL, SL
- Japanese: BL, SL
- Karen
- Khmer
- Korean: BL
- Macedonian
- Malay: BS
- Maltese
- Modern Greek
- Persian
- Polish
- Portuguese
- Punjabi
- Romanian
- Russian
- Serbian
- Sinhala
- Spanish
- Swedish
- Tamil
- Turkish
- Vietnamese
- Yiddish

BL: Background Language; BS: Background Speakers; FL: First Language; SL: Second Language.

=== VET industry specific courses ===
- Automotive
- Business and Financial Services
- Community Services and Health
- Construction Industries
- Creative Industries
- Engineering
- Health and Physical Education
- Hospitality and Tourism
- Information and Communications Technology
- Primary Industries
- Sport and Recreation

== ATAR ==
The Australian Tertiary Admission Rank (ATAR) is a ranking awarded to most students achieving a Senior Secondary Certificate of Education in each state and territory of Australia, except Queensland until the 2020-21 admission cycle, for the purposes of university admission. The Tertiary Institutions Service Centre (TISC) calculates and awards the ATAR in Western Australia. It is a rank relative to all other school-leaving aged people in Western Australia from 99.95 to 0.00. It represents the percentage of school-leaving aged people in Western Australia that a student has achieved at an equal or higher standard, including those who do not sit the WACE or an equivalent school-leaving certificate. For example, an ATAR of 70.00 means that a student has achieved at an equal or better level than 70% of all school-leaving aged people in the state.

The ATAR is calculated using the Tertiary Entrance Aggregate (TEA). Each student's results in each subject are standardized and scaled using each student's results in other courses to reflect the overall achievement of each student in each subject. The TEA is the sum of each student's best four scaled marks, plus 10% of the mark in any of the following subjects:

- Languages other than English (LOTE),
- Mathematics Methods, or
- Mathematics Specialist.

Students may use scores from up to a five-year period, but each course can only be counted once. TISC uses the best score (not the most recent score) in each course to count for the ATAR if students have repeated one or more courses. The TEA has a maximum of 430. Each student's TEA is then ranked across the state and ATARs are awarded according to the ranking of the TEA.

Each state's tertiary admissions centre calculates and awards ATARs within their own states, but an ATAR in each state is equivalent and transferable. WACE students can therefore use their ATARs for interstate university admission, and interstate students can use their ATARs (or Queensland's OP) for entrance into Western Australian universities. The Interstate Transfer Index (ITI) is used to maintain the equivalence of ATARs across states, and all states can use the same method using only Year 12 results, rather than any pre-Year 12 studies in conjunction with final year results.

== School rankings ==
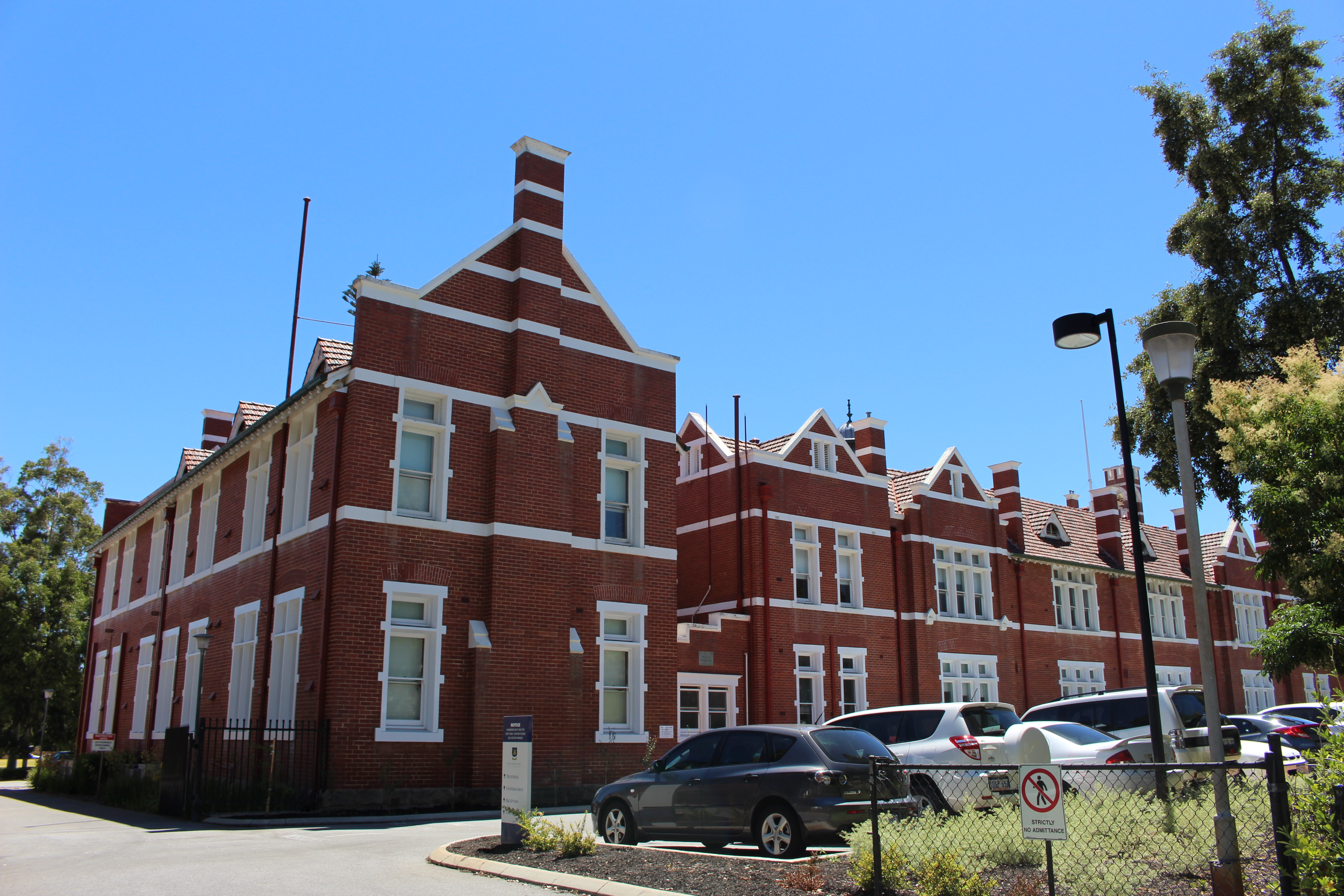
Perth Modern School, ranked the top achieving school in the WACE between 2016 and 2019

The School Curriculum and Standards Authority publishes yearly rankings of the top performing schools in that year's WACE. From 2012 to 2015, SCSA reported rankings in terms of percentage of marks of 75 or higher in WACE stage 3 courses. From 2016 onwards, SCSA has reported rankings in terms of each school's median ATAR. Since moving to this new format, Perth Modern School was ranked the top achieving school in the WACE for the six years from 2016 to 2021.

In 2021, SCSA choose to not formally release the rankings, although this data is still accessible via an online lookup tool. This instead has individual school's statistics performance statistics, so a list can still collated.

WACE top five ranked schools (median ATAR in brackets)
| Ranking | 2016 | 2017 | 2018 | 2019 | 2020 | 2021 |
|---|---|---|---|---|---|---|
| 1 | Perth Modern School (95.55) | Perth Modern School (95.90) | Perth Modern School (97.00) | Perth Modern School (96.75) | Perth Modern School (97.55) | Perth Modern School (96.45) |
| 2 | Presbyterian Ladies' College (92.90) | St Hilda's Anglican School for Girls (93.60) | Carmel School (92.60) | Hale School (92.85) | St Hilda's Anglican School for Girls (92.70) | St Hilda's Anglican School for Girls (92.85) |
| 3 | Penrhos College (92.65) | Christ Church Grammar School (92.45) | St Mary's Anglican Girls' School (92.10) | Christ Church Grammar School (92.50) | Christ Church Grammar School (92.50) | Christ Church Grammar School (92.80) |
| 4 | Christ Church Grammar School (92.50) | Penrhos College (91.20) | Methodist Ladies' College (92.00) | St Mary's Anglican Girls' School (91.15) | Penrhos College (90.65) | Hale School (91.85) |
| 5 | Santa Maria College (91.85) | St Mary's Anglican Girls' School (90.95) | St Hilda's Anglican School for Girls (91.65) | Presbyterian Ladies' College (90.75) | Methodist Ladies' College (90.55) | Penrhos College (91.45) |

== Vocational Education and Training ==
Vocational Education and Training (VET) courses can contribute towards a student's attainment of the WACE, allowing students to study courses which lead directly into employment after school. There are two main categories of VET courses: VET industry specific and VET credit transfer. VET industry specific courses contribute to both the unit and Certificate II or higher requirements of the WACE, and include both a full qualification and workplace learning. Credit transfer courses provide a way for students to attain VET qualifications separate to industry specific courses, while still contributing to the WACE requirements. As such, both types of courses contribute towards meeting the requirements of a student's WACE.

In terms of meeting requirements for the WACE, the two categories function in different ways. For the achievement standards requirement, successful completion of an industry specific course is considered equivalent to a C grade or higher result in a WACE course, whereas credit transfer courses reduce the number of C grades a student must achieve. Neither category of course contributes to the breadth of study requirements. Both courses contribute to the depth of study requirements. Industry specific courses count directly towards the depth requirements, whilst credit transfer courses are considered "unit equivalence" of regular WACE courses. Students can only count 8 credit transfer units towards the standards and depth requirements, there are no such limits for industry specific courses.

A list of endorsed unit equivalence programs is available on the School Curriculum and Standards Authority website.

== Reforms ==
=== Move away from Tertiary Entrance Exam ===
From 2002 to 2010, following the Western Australian Government's Post-Compulsory Education Review, the WACE was reformed. It changed from a fragmented system with three types of curriculum: externally assessed TEE, Wholly School Assessed, and VET components, to a single curriculum combining these three components. The curriculum was simplified, from hundreds of courses down to around fifty, and students were given increased flexibility in completing their studies. Courses were adapted to the new WACE standard across three phases, from 2005 to 2009, so that by 2010, the new WACE standard of examinations had replaced the former TEE standard. While TEE external examinations were not compulsory, the WACE examinations that replaced the TEE are compulsory for all students, unless exempt.

=== Introduction of General courses ===
As the number of students studying VET courses doubled to sixty percent of the student cohort in the ten years to 2016 the VET component of the WACE will be reformed for Year 10 students from 2019, Year 11 students from 2020 and Year 12 students from 2021 who can study General courses. The General course pathway can lead to university, employment, or further vocational education and training. The Western Australian Minister for Education and Training, Sue Ellery, described the changes as offering a pathway in between the existing ATAR/university and VET options: In the past you chose ATAR courses if you wanted to go to university and VET courses if you wanted to link into training and this middle ground gives students an option for both". All other WACE requirements will remain the same.

== WACE in other countries ==
The WACE is also available overseas in South East Asia. This offers an affordable option for international students who would otherwise not have the opportunity take this exam in Australia. Exams are invigilated and moderated by SCSA. In Singapore, the WACE program is offered at St Francis Methodist School. In Malaysia, the WACE is offered under the name of Australian Matriculation, or AUSMAT, and offers Malaysian students a study pathway recognised in Malaysia and across the globe. It is also offered at Mita International School in Tokyo, Japan from 2021.
