= School Curriculum and Standards Authority =

Legal body that administers education in Western Australia

The School Curriculum and Standards Authority is the statutory authority of the Government of Western Australia responsible for developing school curriculum and standards in education across Western Australia. The agency superseded the Curriculum Council of Western Australia which was disbanded following a litany of failures in 2012 by the education minister Peter Collier.

The inaugural chair of the Authority is Patrick Garnett.

The Authority is supported by a secretariat of about 148 staff.
