= Teaching in Victoria =

Academic system of Victoria, Australia

Teaching in Victoria, Australia is regulated by the Victorian Institute of Teaching, through the Department of Education and Training (DET), which is part of the State Government. The DEECD is biggest operator of schools in the state, and along with the independent and Catholic school systems have an interest in teaching as the operator of schools and employer of teachers.

Education and teaching in Victoria follows the three-tier model consisting of primary education (primary schools), followed by secondary education (secondary schools or secondary colleges) and tertiary education (Universities and TAFE Colleges).

Regardless of whether a school is government or independent, they are required to adhere to the same curriculum frameworks. Education in all government schools must be secular and not promote any particular religious practice, denomination or sect.

Post-compulsory education is regulated within the Australian Qualifications Framework, a unified system of national qualifications in schools, vocational education and training (TAFE) and the higher education sector (university).

== Teacher qualifications and training ==
All teachers graduating from Victorian pre-service teacher education programs in recent years have completed pre-service teacher education courses approved under the guidelines developed by the Victorian Institute of Teaching Standards Council.

Prospective teachers must undertake a four-year undergraduate programs in either a single education degree (e.g. Bachelor of Education) or a double degree where two degrees are completed at the same time (e.g. Bachelor of Teaching/Bachelor of Arts). Alternatively, graduates who already hold a non-teaching degree or equivalent may undertake their pre-service teacher education in a postgraduate course of one or two years duration (e.g. Graduate Diploma of Education, Graduate Diploma in Education, Bachelor of Teaching). As of 2013 the one year courses are being phased out. For one-year course graduates, there are non-teaching masters courses that can be used to increase their educational qualifications. Most of these courses are a one and a half-year courses. VTAC which administers course entry has failed to make this change clear to applicants in 2013.

All prospective teachers must also undertake supervised teaching practice (known as the practicum) of at least 45 days. Most one-year postgraduate programs include 45–60 days. Longer postgraduate and undergraduate programs include 60–100 days. Many also include periods of professional field experience (not usually formally supervised teaching practice) in schools.

== Teacher registration ==
Teachers must be registered by the Victorian Institute of Teaching (VIT) before they can teach in Victoria, whether they teach in a government, Catholic or independent school.

VIT is the statutory authority responsible for the regulation and promotion of the teaching profession in Victoria.

== Public and private schools ==
According to the Schools Australia Preliminary Report, released by the Australian Bureau of Statistics on 4 February 2008, the number of students enrolled in Victorian state schools was 535,883 in 2007 – a drop of 234 students on the 2006 figures, while the non-government sector stood at 297,970 in 2007 – a gain of 4,252 students. The non-government sector, which includes Catholic, private and Jewish schools, recorded steady growth since 2002, gaining more than 16,890 students in the past five years.

However, while government schools recorded a fall in student numbers in the past two years, the sector recorded growth between 2002 and 2005, and in the past five years recorded an overall gain of 2,466 students.

Despite a five-year growth in the numbers of students attending government schools, the number of Victorian government schools fell to 1,592 in 2007, down from 1,605 in 2006 and 1,613 in 2005. The number of independent schools rose from 210 in 2006 to 214 in 2007.

As at 3 August 2007, teacher-student ratios were higher in the Victorian government sector, at 13.8, compared with 12.9 in the non-government sector. However, in both sectors Victoria compared favourably with national figures: the national teacher-student ratio in government schools was higher at 14.2, and 13.8 in the non-government sector.

There was a rise in the number of teaching staff in Victoria, up from 68,697 in 2006 to 70,342 in 2007.

== Curriculum ==
The curriculum for all Victorian schools, government and non-governments, from Preparatory year to Year 12 is determined by the Victorian Curriculum and Assessment Authority (VCAA). Since 2013, Schools have used the Australian Curriculum based AusVELS framework for classes between prep and Year 10. Prior to this, the Victorian Essential Learning Standards (VELS) framework applied. For Years 11 to 12 the Victorian Certificate of Education (VCE) program applies. Authorized schools may teach the International Baccalaureate Primary Years Programme, Middle Years Programme and Diploma Programme in place of VELS and/or the VCE. Due to the cost of implementing these alternative programmes they are rarely offered by government schools.

== Pre-school ==
Pre-school in Victoria is relatively unregulated and not compulsory. The first exposure many Australian children have to learn with others outside of traditional parenting is day care or a parent-run playgroup. This sort of activity is not generally considered schooling. Pre-school education is separate from primary school.

Pre-schools are usually run by local councils, community groups or private organizations. Pre-school is offered to three- to five-year-olds. Attendance in pre-school is 93% in Victoria. The year before a child is due to attend primary school is the main year for pre-school education. This year is far more commonly attended, and usually takes the form of a few hours of activity five days a week.

== Primary schools ==
Primary education consists of seven grades: a Preparatory year (commonly called "Prep") followed by Years 1 to 6. The minimum age at which a Victorian child can commence primary school education is 4.8 years. That is, the child can enroll in a school at the preparatory level if he or she would be five years of age by 30 April of that year. A Victorian child must commence education before age six.

== Secondary schools ==
Secondary schools consist of Years 7 to 12. Secondary schools are usually separate institutions to primary schools, though some non-government schools combine primary and secondary levels.

== See also ==
- Education in Victoria
- Victorian Essential Learning Standards
- Victorian Certificate of Education (VCE)
- Victorian Certificate of Applied Learning
- Victorian Curriculum and Assessment Authority (VCAA)
- Victorian Tertiary Admissions Centre (VTAC)
- List of schools in Victoria, Australia
- Education in Australia
- Department of Education and Early Childhood Development
- Ultranet (product)
