= Year 12 =

Educational year group

Year 12 is an educational year group in schools in several countries, including Australia, England, Wales, Northern Ireland, and New Zealand. Depending on the education system, it may be the final year of secondary education, the second-to-last year of secondary education, or a year of post-compulsory education. Students are generally between 16 and 18 years old, although the age range varies by jurisdiction.

== Australia ==
In Australia, Year 12 is the final year of secondary education in most states and territories. Together with Year 11, it forms the senior secondary years of schooling. Senior secondary education may be undertaken at a secondary school, senior secondary college, or through other approved education and training pathways.

Education in Australia is primarily administered by the states and territories, so the structure, leaving requirements, curriculum, and senior secondary qualifications vary between jurisdictions. The Australian Curriculum generally covers schooling from Foundation to Year 10, while state and territory authorities are responsible for its implementation and for senior secondary education.

Students completing Year 12 normally work towards a Senior Secondary Certificate of Education (SSCE), although the name and requirements of the certificate differ between states and territories. The certificate signifies successful completion of Year 12.

Year 12 students may undertake academic subjects, vocational education and training (VET), school-based apprenticeships, or combinations of these pathways. Completion of Year 12 can provide pathways to tertiary education, vocational training, employment, or further education.

=== Victoria ===
In Victoria, Year 12 is generally the second and final year of senior secondary education. Students may complete the Victorian Certificate of Education (VCE), including the VCE Vocational Major, or the Victorian Pathways Certificate depending on their educational pathway. The VCE was introduced in 1990 as a two-year certificate covering Years 11 and 12.

=== New South Wales ===
In New South Wales, Year 12 is the final year of secondary education. Students commonly work towards the Higher School Certificate (HSC), which is awarded by the NSW Education Standards Authority (NESA).

=== Queensland ===
In Queensland, Year 12 is the final year of senior secondary schooling. Students may complete the Queensland Certificate of Education (QCE), which recognises learning undertaken during senior secondary education. Students may also undertake vocational education and training or other approved pathways.

== New Zealand ==
In New Zealand, Year 12 is the second-to-last year of secondary education and is generally followed by Year 13. Students entering Year 12 are typically around 16 years old. Year 12 is generally undertaken at a secondary school or area school.

Students commonly work towards qualifications within the National Certificate of Educational Achievement (NCEA) framework, although the qualifications and structure of senior secondary education have undergone changes over time.

== United Kingdom ==
=== England and Wales ===
In England, Year 12 is the first year of Key Stage 5 and is commonly known as the Lower Sixth. It is normally followed by Year 13, known as the Upper Sixth. Together, Years 12 and 13 generally make up the final two years of secondary education.

Students in Year 12 commonly study qualifications such as A levels, T Levels, or vocational qualifications such as BTECs. Students may remain at their secondary school or attend a sixth form college or further education college.

In England, young people are required to remain in education or training until the age of 18, although this does not necessarily require full-time attendance at school.

In Wales, Year 12 is also generally the first year of post-16 education and is followed by Year 13. Students may study qualifications including A levels and vocational qualifications.

=== Scotland ===
In Scotland, the equivalent year is generally known as S5 (Secondary 5), rather than Year 12. S5 is normally the second-last year of secondary education and is followed by S6. Students in S5 commonly undertake Scottish Qualifications Authority qualifications such as Scottish Highers.

=== Northern Ireland ===
In Northern Ireland, Year 12 is the final year of Key Stage 4 and is generally the fifth year of secondary education. Students are typically around 15 or 16 years old.

Students commonly complete GCSE and vocational qualifications during this stage. After Year 12, students may continue into post-16 education, including sixth form, further education, vocational education and training, or apprenticeships.

== See also ==
- Year 11
- Year 13
- Secondary education
- Senior secondary education
- Sixth form
- Senior Secondary Certificate of Education
