= Education in Victoria =

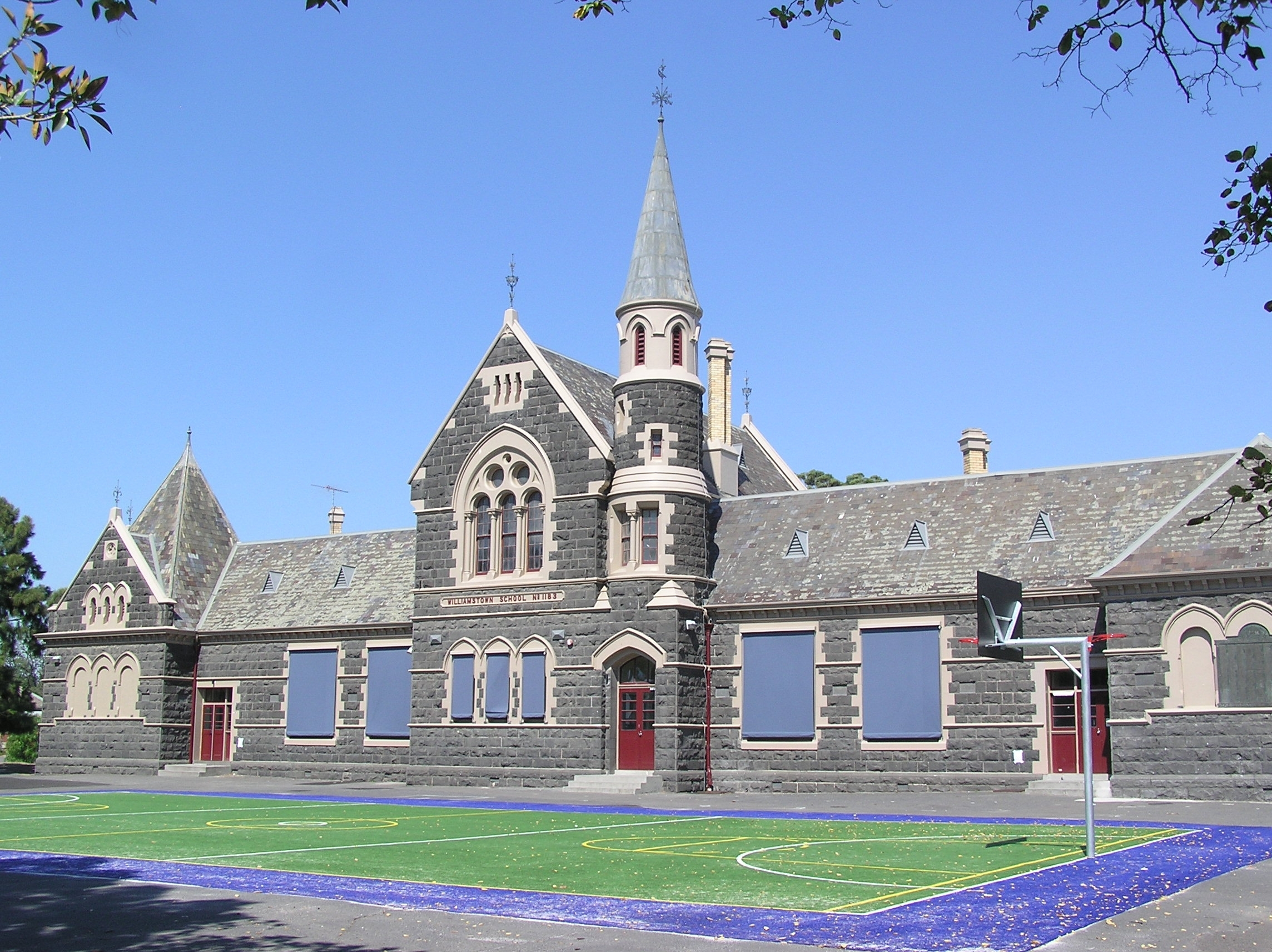
Williamstown Primary School

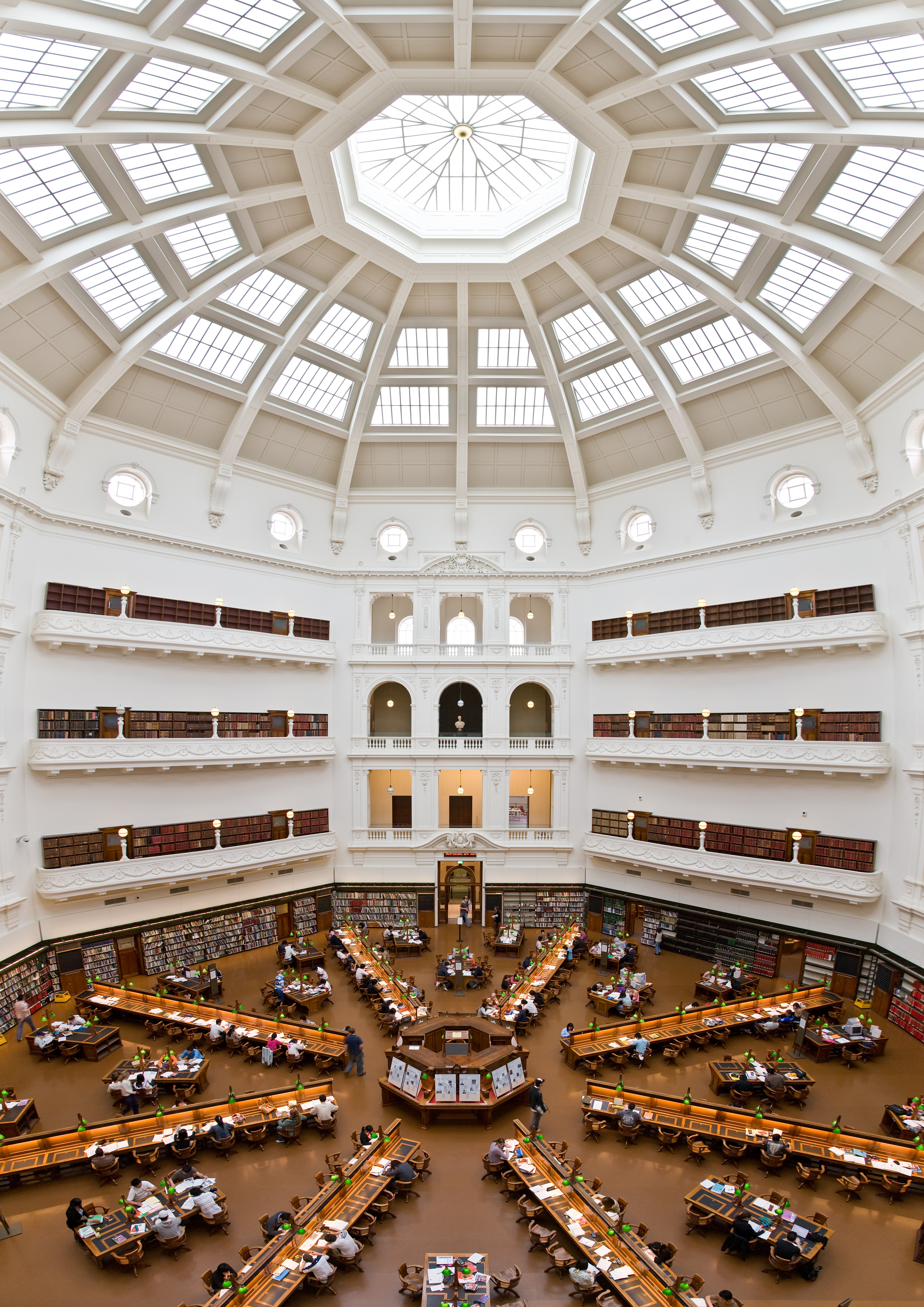
State Library of Victoria, Melbourne's largest public library. (La Trobe Reading Room – 5th floor view)

Education in Victoria, Australia is supervised by the Department of Education and Training, which is part of the State Government and whose role is to "provide policy and planning advice for the delivery of education". It acts as advisor to two state ministers, that for Education and for Children and Early Childhood Development.

Education in Victoria follows the three-tier model consisting of primary education (primary schools), followed by secondary education (secondary schools or secondary colleges) and tertiary education (universities and TAFE Colleges).

School education is compulsory in Victoria between the ages of six and seventeen. A student is free to leave school on turning seventeen, which is prior to completing secondary education. In recent years over three-quarters of students are reported to be staying on until they are eighteen, at the end of the secondary school level. Government schools educate 64% of Victorian students, with 21% of students in Catholic schools and the remaining 15% in independent schools as of 2021.

Education in government schools until year 12 is free, but this does not apply to overseas students nor to students over the age of 20 on 1 January of the year of enrolment. Independent schools, both religious and secular, charge fees, which are subsidised by the Federal and State governments.

Although non-tertiary public education is free, 36% of students attend a non-government school as of 2021. The most numerous private schools are Catholic, and the rest are independent (see Public and Private Education in Australia). As of 2021, there were 1553 government schools, 497 Catholic schools and 226 independent schools in Victoria.

Regardless of whether a school is government or independent, they are required to adhere to the same curriculum frameworks. Education in all government schools is secular and must not promote any particular religious practice, denomination or sect. Most school students, be they in a government, Catholic or independent school, usually wear uniforms, although there are varying expectations and some schools do not require uniforms.

Post-compulsory education is regulated within the Australian Qualifications Framework, a unified system of national qualifications in schools, vocational education and training (TAFE) and the higher education sector (university).

The academic year in Victoria generally runs from late January until mid-December for primary and secondary schools and TAFE colleges, and from late February until mid-November for universities. Victorian schools operate on a four term basis. Schools are closed for the Victorian public holidays. Universities observe the Commonwealth public holidays.

== History ==
There was a clause in the Victorian Constitution of 1855, which provided for state funding for religion. Richard Heales, a short-lived Premier of Victoria, was an opponent of the clause, and favoured a unified secular education system. Both Anglicans and Catholics, on the other hand, favoured state-funded religious schools. In 1862 Heales (no longer the Premier) introduced a bill in Parliament to create a single Board of Education to rationalise the colony's school system, which was passed with broad support.

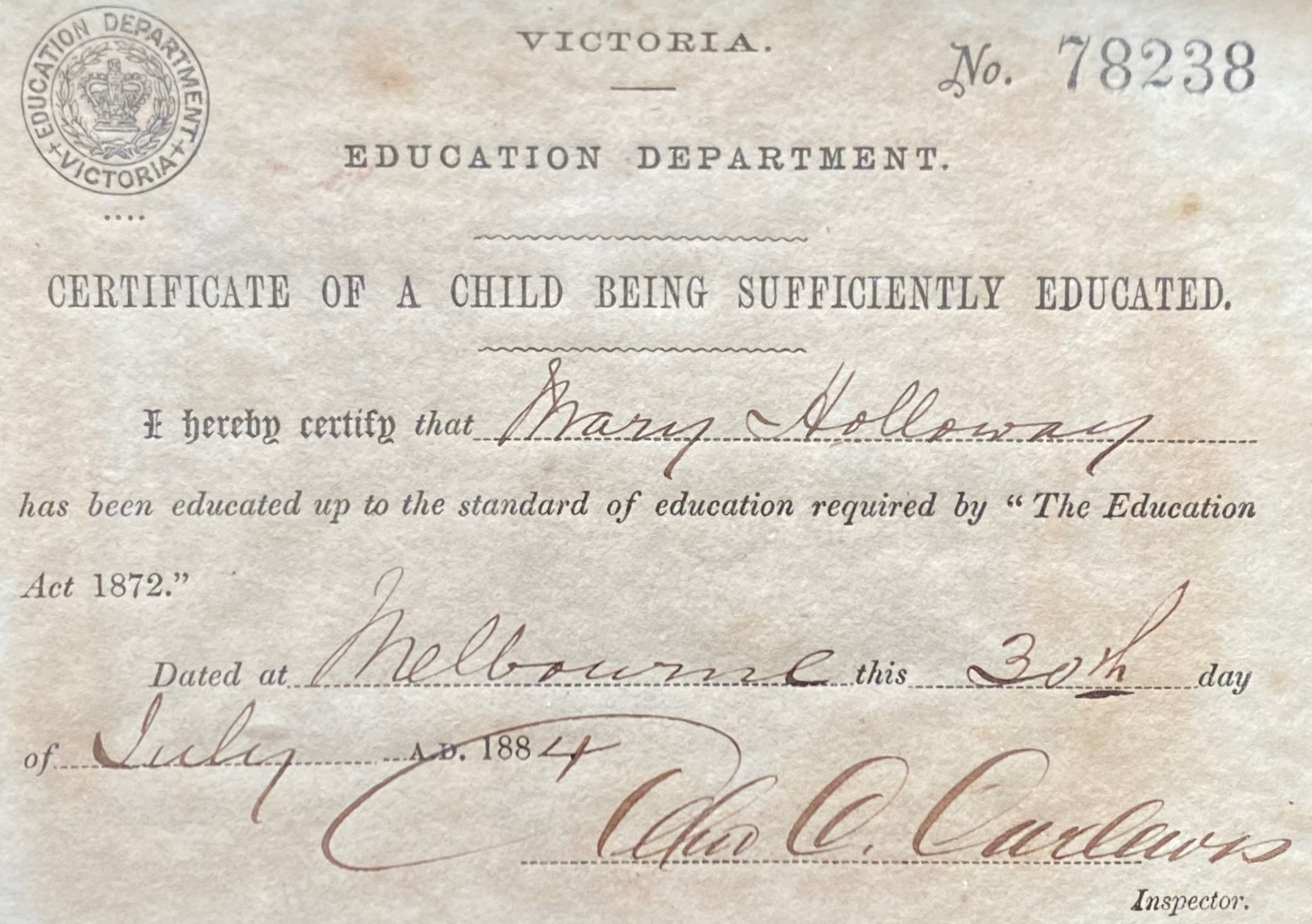
Education certificate from 1884

Until 1872 state-funded religious schools were governed and administered separately from their secular counterparts. The Denominational School Board provided for religious schools while the National School Board, later the Board of Education, provided government sponsored secular education. In 1872, following growing dissatisfaction with State funding of religious schools and the burgeoning cost of funding and administering a dual school system, the government introduced free, compulsory and secular education, establishing the first Education Department. The department became the employer of school teachers, and was led by Victoria's first Minister of Public Instruction. State funding of religious schools ended in 1874.

From 1979 to 1982 the Hamer Liberal government initiated and implemented the most significant and far-reaching reorganisation of the Victorian Education Department in the 20th century. Alan Hunt, as Minister of Education (1979–1982), and Norman Lacy, as Assistant Minister of Education (1979–1980) and Minister for Educational Services (1980–1982), were jointly responsible for the reform policy development process and the early stages of its implementation.

Hunt appointed Lacy Chairman of the Ministerial Consultative Committee that steered the project in its early phase and the Implementation Steering Committee later. Lacy's managerial and educational philosophy were a significant influence on the process and the outcome. He pulled together a group of people from academia and business to assist him as well as PA Management Consultants. The Government legislated – at the end of 1981 – to scrap the teaching divisions (Primary, Secondary and Technical) and to remove the statutory bodies (The Committee of Classifiers and the Teachers' Tribunal). Hunt and Lacy sought and obtained the support of the Labor opposition and the National Party. When the Cain Labor government won office in the April 1982 election the new Minister of Education, Robert Fordham (1982–1985), instituted a policy review by a Ministerial Review Committee headed by Dr. Ken McKinnon. The committee, made up mostly of teacher union and parent organisation representatives, recommended modifications which Fordham went on to incorporate as he completed the restructuring of the department, generally as recommended by the White Paper. Fordham had supported the general thrust of the reform process while in opposition and followed through with the project when in government.

From 1992-1999, the Kennett government closed over 350 schools and sacked over 8000 teachers, or over 10% of the workforce.

== Tiers ==
=== Pre-school ===
Pre-school in Victoria for three and four-year-olds is regulated and funded (currently a roll-out system for 3-year-old funding is underway until 2029) while not compulsory. The first exposure many Australian children have to learn with others outside of traditional parenting is day care or a parent-run playgroup. This sort of activity is not generally considered schooling. Pre-school education is separate from primary school.

Pre-schools are usually run by local councils, community groups or private organizations. Pre-school is offered to three- to five-year-olds. Attendance in pre-school is 93% in Victoria. The year before a child is due to attend primary school is the main year for pre-school education. This year is far more commonly attended, and usually takes the form of 15 hours per week.

=== Primary schools ===
Primary education consists of seven grades: a Preparatory year (commonly called "Prep") followed by Years 1 to 6. The minimum age at which a Victorian child can commence primary school education is 4.8 years. That is, the child can enroll in a school at the preparatory level if he or she would be five years of age by 30 April of that year.

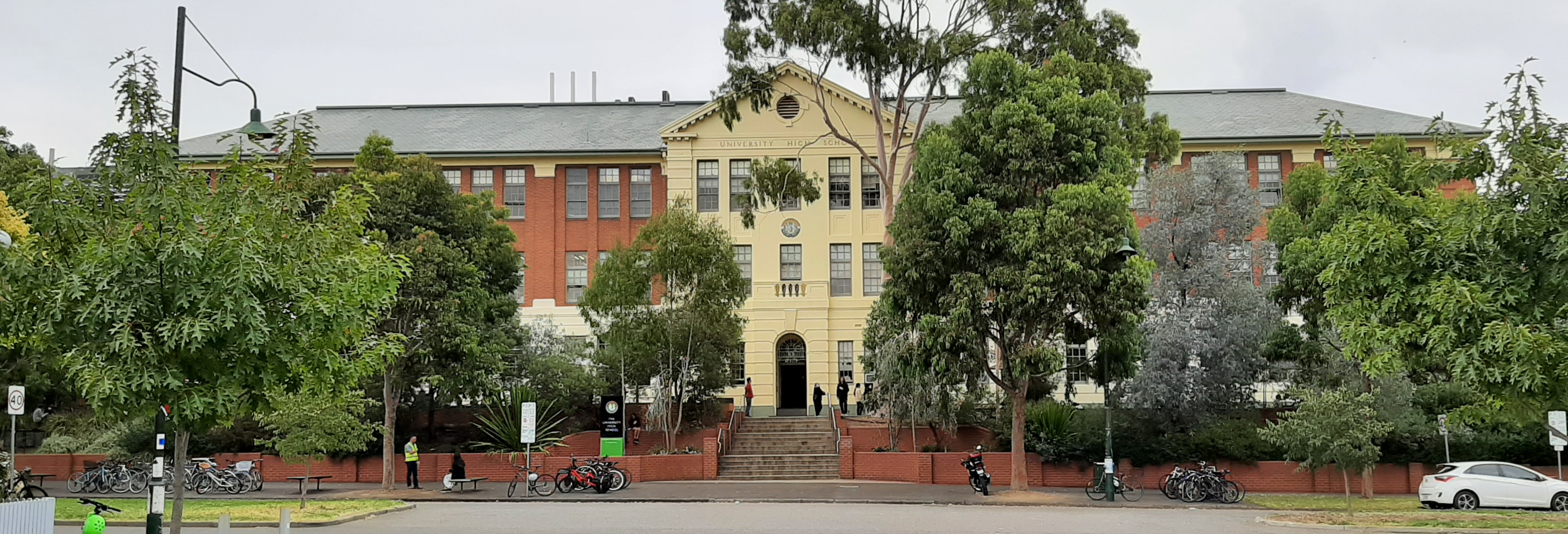
University High School, Parkville

=== Secondary schools ===
Secondary schools (also called high schools or secondary colleges) consist of Years 7 to 12. Secondary schools are usually separate institutions to primary schools, although in recent years, the number of combined primary and secondary schools has increased.

There are seven selective public schools in Melbourne (entry based on examination/audition): Melbourne High School, MacRobertson Girls' High School, Nossal High School, Suzanne Cory High School, John Monash Science School, The University High School's Elizabeth Blackburn Science School and the Victorian College of the Arts Secondary School, but all public schools may restrict entry to students living in their regional 'zone'.

The Victorian Student Representative Council serves to connect student voice efforts across the state.

== Curriculum ==
The curriculum for all Victorian schools, government and non-governments, from Prep to Year 12 is determined by the Victorian Curriculum and Assessment Authority (VCAA). Between Prep and Year 9 the Victorian Curriculum framework and Achievement Improvement Monitor (AIM) certificates apply. For Years 10 to 12 the Victorian Certificate of Education (VCE) program and Victorian Certificate of Applied Learning (VCAL) apply.

== Assessment ==
Students in Years 10 to 12, whether in government or non-government schools, normally are assessed for the Victorian Certificate of Education (VCE). The curriculum and assessment is determined by the Victorian Curriculum and Assessment Authority (VCAA) and the final ATAR (Australian Tertiary Admission Rank) score, used for advancement to tertiary education, is determined by the Victorian Tertiary Admissions Centre (VTAC). Years 10, 11 and 12 students may study under the Victorian Certificate of Applied Learning (VCAL) or International Baccalaureate programs in place of the VCE. (List of schools offering the International Baccalaureate Primary Years Programme)

Literacy and numeracy skills of Victorian school students are monitored by the Achievement Improvement Monitor (AIM) program. Each student's skills are assessed at Years 3, 5, 7 and 9 levels.

== Providers ==
=== Government or state schools ===
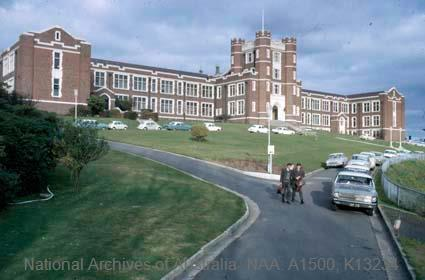
Melbourne High School in 1965

The state government owns and operates schools at both primary and secondary levels. These schools are generally called government or state schools. They do not charge compulsory fees, with the majority of their costs being met by the government, and the rest by voluntary levies and by fund raising.

Four government secondary schools are entirely selective: Melbourne High School, catering for boys, Mac.Robertson Girls' High School, catering for girls, as well as Nossal High School and Suzanne Cory High School, catering for both boys and girls. These offer classes from Years 9 to 12 and cater for academically gifted students. There are also schools which specialise in performing arts and sports. The remainder are open schools which accept all students from the government-defined catchment areas, although some are single sex. Selective schools are more prestigious than open government schools, and, as one would expect, generally achieve better results in the school-leaving exams than independent or open government schools. Entrance to selective schools is by examination and they cater to a large geographical area.

The number of students enrolled in Victorian state schools was 648,044 in 2021, compared to 535,883 in 2007, an increase of 21%. The non-government sector stood at 366,201 in 2021, compared to 297,970 in 2007, an increase of 23%.

As at 3 August 2007, teacher-student ratios were higher in the Victorian government sector, at 13.8, compared with 12.9 in the non-government sector. However, in both sectors Victoria compared favourably with national figures: the national teacher-student ratio in government schools was higher at 14.2, and 13.8 in the non-government sector.

As of 2020, there were 48,411 FTE teachers in Victorian government schools. The student-teacher ratios for government-run schools were 14.1 for primary schools, and 12.1 for secondary schools in Victoria.

=== Non-government schools ===
Most Catholic schools are either run by their local parish and/or by the Victorian Catholic Education Authority.

Non-Catholic non-government schools (often called "Independent" schools) include schools operated by religious groups and secular educational philosophies such as Montessori.

Some independent schools charge fees as high as $43,000 per year for day students, and $84,000 per year for full boarding students, and even more for overseas students. Government funding for independent schools often comes under criticism from the Australian Education Union and the Australian Labor Party.

Although non-tertiary public education is free, 36% of students attended a non-government primary or secondary school as of 2006. The state has 497 Catholic schools (mostly primary only) and 226 independent schools (mostly prep to year 12).

=== Tertiary institutions ===
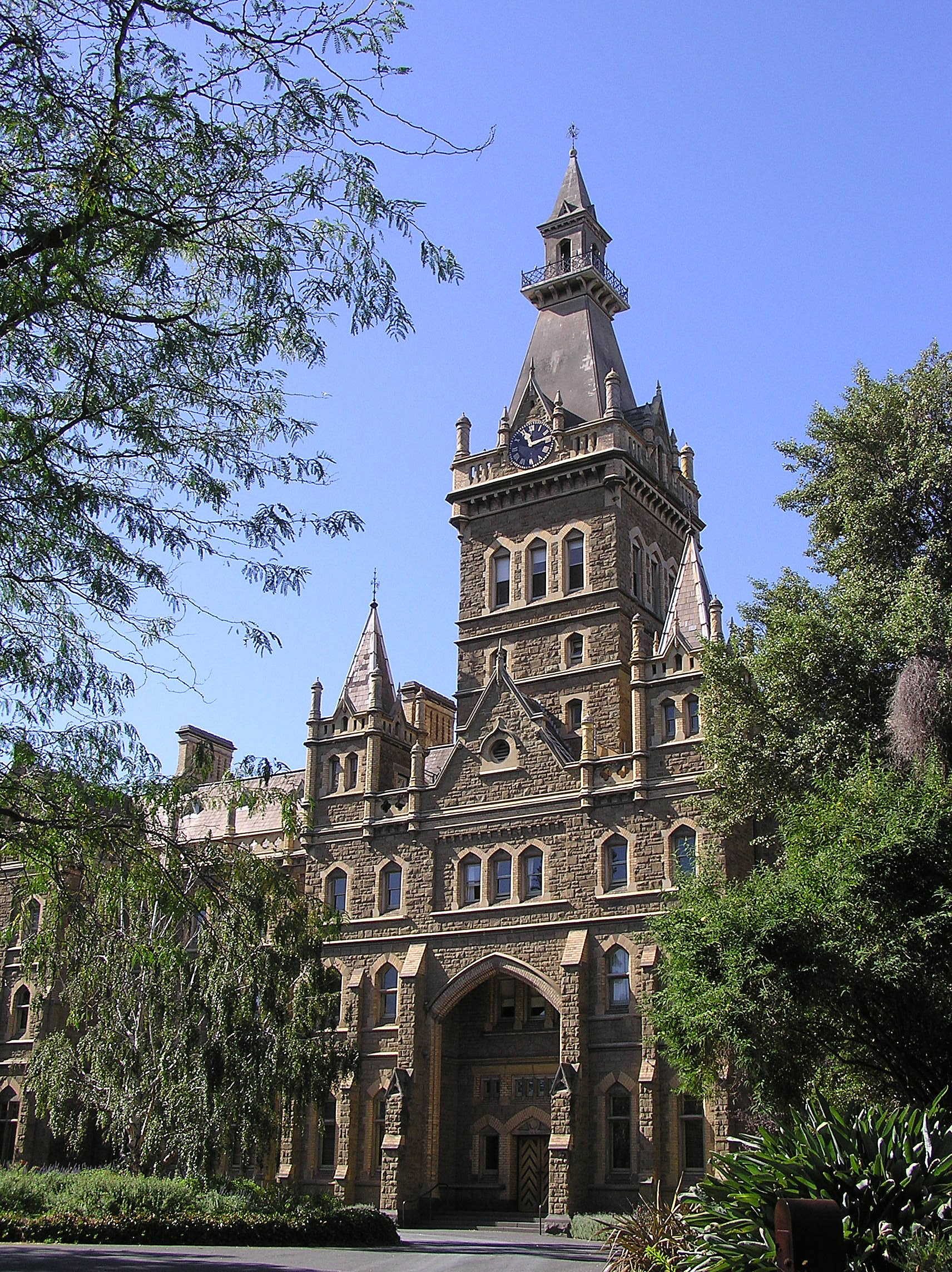
Ormond College (1879), University of Melbourne

Melbourne is the home of the University of Melbourne and Monash University, the largest university in Australia. It is also home to the largest metropolitan campus in Australia, with La Trobe University's Melbourne Campus in Bundoora being 267 hectares in area. Melbourne University is the oldest university in Victoria and the second-oldest university in Australia. It is ranked second among Australian universities in the 2006 THES international rankings. The Times Higher Education Supplement ranked the University of Melbourne as the 36th best university in the world, Monash University was ranked the 38th best university in the world. Both universities are members of the Group of Eight. Other universities located in Melbourne include La Trobe University, RMIT University, Swinburne University of Technology, based in the inner city Melbourne suburb of Hawthorn, Victoria University, which has nine campuses across Melbourne's western region, including three in the heart of Melbourne's Central Business District (CBD) and another four within ten kilometres of the CBD, and the St Patrick's campus of the Australian Catholic University. Deakin University maintains two major campuses in Melbourne and Geelong, and is the third largest university in Victoria. In recent years, the number of international students at Melbourne's universities has risen rapidly, a result of an increasing number of places being made available to full fee paying students.

The classification of tertiary qualifications in Victoria is governed in part by the Australian Qualifications Framework (AQF), which attempts to integrate into a single national classification all levels of tertiary education (both vocational and higher education), from trade certificates to higher doctorates.

However, as Universities in Australia (and a few similar higher education institutions) largely regulate their own courses, the primary usage of AQF is for vocational education. However, in recent years there have been some informal moves towards standardization between higher education institutions.

The city of Melbourne was ranked the world's fourth top university city in 2008 after London, Boston and Tokyo.

=== Technical and Further Education (TAFE) ===
Technical and Further Education (TAFE) institutes are state-administered. TAFE institutions generally offer short courses, Certificates I, II, III, and IV, Diplomas, and Advanced Diplomas in a wide range of vocational topics. They also sometimes offer Higher Education courses.

Six TAFE institutes are located in Melbourne: the Box Hill Institute, Holmesglen Institute, Chisholm Institute, Kangan Institute, NMIT and William Angliss Institute

In addition to TAFE institutes, there are approximately 1100 privately operated registered training organisations (RTOs). They include:

- commercial training providers,
- the training department of manufacturing or service enterprises,
- the training function of employer or employee organisations in a particular industry,
- Group Training Companies,
- community learning centres and neighbourhood houses,
- secondary colleges providing VET programs.

In size these RTOs vary from single-person operations delivering training and assessment in a narrow specialisation, to large organisations offering a wide range of programs. Many of them receive government funding to deliver programs to apprentices or trainees, to disadvantaged groups, or in fields which governments see as priority areas.

All TAFE institutes and private RTOs are required to maintain compliance with a set of national standards called the Australian Quality Training Framework (AQTF), and this compliance is monitored by regular internal and external audits.

Vocational education and training (VET) VET programs delivered by TAFE Institutes and private RTOs are based on nationally registered qualifications, derived from either endorsed sets of competency standards known as Training Packages, or from courses accredited by state/territory government authorities. These qualifications are regularly reviewed and updated. In specialised areas where no publicly owned qualifications exist, an RTO may develop its own course and have it accredited as a privately owned program, subject to the same rules as those that are publicly owned.

All trainers and assessors delivering VET programs are required to hold a qualification known as the Certificate IV in Training and Assessment (TAE40110) or demonstrate equivalent competency. They are also required to have relevant vocational competencies, at least to the level being delivered or assessed.

=== Other educational facilities ===
==== Learn Local education and training ====
Learn Local organisations deliver a broad range of education and training in community settings. Each year over 110,000 Victorians undertake training at a Learn Local organisation. To be part of the Learn Local network and deliver pre-accredited training, an organisation must be registered with the Adult, Community and Further Education (ACFE) Board.

Learn Local organisations can deliver both pre-accredited and accredited training. Pre-accredited training is unique to the Learn Local sector. Pre-accredited training programs are designed to help learners gain the confidence and skills needed to seek employment and further education opportunities. They include courses in communication, job search skills, returning to work skills and literacy and numeracy skills. In order to offer accredited training, Learn Local organisations have to be Registered Training Organisations (RTOs) which results in the delivery of qualifications equivalent to TAFE and private RTOs. Approximately 50% of Learn Local organisations are RTOs.

Learn Local organisations also offer other services such as childcare facilities, career advice, financial assistance or disability support services to support people to be able to undertake learning.

There are over 300 Learn Local organisations across regional, rural and metropolitan Victoria, Australia which form the Learn Local education and training sector. There are also two AEI (Adult Educational Institutions) in the Learn Local network, CAE and AMES.

==== Centre for Adult Education ====
The Centre for Adult Education (previously known as the Council of Adult Education) provides a wide range of accredited adult education courses, with a strong focus in arts, languages and adult secondary education. Other options include business, computers, human services, languages, wellbeing, fitness and literacy. (CAE website) CAE receives state government funding. CAE's objective is to deliver courses designed to help adults complete their secondary education and begin or change their career direction.

==== AMES Australia ====
AMES Australia AMES Australia is a national provider of settlement services for refugees and asylum seekers. AMES Australia provides initial settlement support, English language and literacy tuition, vocational training and employment services to migrants, refugees and asylum seekers living in Victoria, and employment services in Western Sydney.

=== Notable alumni ===
Melbourne schools are predominant among Australian schools whose alumni are listed in Who's Who in Australia, a listing of notable Australians. In the top ten boys' schools in Australia for Who's Who-listed alumni, Melbourne schools are Scotch College (first in Australia - it is also Melbourne's oldest secondary school), Melbourne Grammar School (second), Melbourne High School (third), Geelong Grammar School (fourth - has a junior campus in suburban Toorak) and Wesley College (sixth). In the top ten girls' schools for Who's Who-listed alumni Melbourne schools are Presbyterian Ladies' College (first in Australia), Methodist Ladies College (third), Melbourne Girls Grammar School (fifth), Mac.Robertson Girls' High School (sixth) and University High School (tenth).

== See also ==
- Department of Education and Early Childhood Development
- Education in Australia
- Light Timber Construction schools
- Public and Private Education in Australia
- List of schools in Victoria
- List of universities and research institutions in Melbourne
- Special Assistance Program (Australian education)
- TAFE Victoria
- Victorian Certificate of Education (VCE)
- Victorian Certificate of Applied Learning
- Victorian Curriculum and Assessment Authority (VCAA)
- Victorian Essential Learning Standards
- Victorian Tertiary Admissions Centre (VTAC)
