= Kevin Donnelly =

Conservative Australian educator, author, and commentator (born 1952)

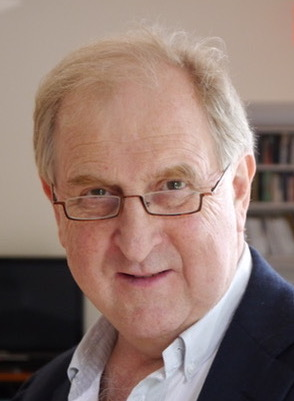
- Born: 7 January 1952 (age 74); Melbourne, Victoria, Australia
- Education: Broadmeadows High School; Melbourne High School
- Alma mater: La Trobe University
- Occupations: Educator, author and commentator
- Writing career
- Subjects: Education, culture
- Notable works: Taming the Black Dog (2014); The Culture of Freedom (2016); Dumbing Down (2014); How Political Correctness is Destroying Education: And Your Child's Future (2018); How Political Correctness is Destroying Australia (2018); A Politically Correct Dictionary and Guide (2019)
- Website: kevindonnelly.com.au

Kevin John Donnelly AM (born 1952) is an Australian educator, author and commentator. He is Senior Fellow at the Australian Catholic University's PM Glynn Institute

Donnelly has written numerous articles and books on contemporary developments in education, culture and politics. He is known for contributions to the evaluation of the Australian National Curriculum Australian National Curriculum, and for criticisms of the Australian "Safe Schools" programme.

== Early life and education ==
Donnelly was born in Melbourne on 7 January 1952 His father was a Communist and his mother a Catholic. He experienced a difficult childhood with his father being "alcoholic and quite violent at times".

He grew up in "the housing commission tenements of Melbourne’s Broadmeadows in the 1950s" and attended Broadmeadows High School and Melbourne High School.

In 1994, he graduated with a PhD in education from La Trobe University.

== Careers ==
From 1975, Donnelly taught for eighteen years in secondary schools (in both the government and non-government educational systems). He was also branch president of the Victorian Secondary Teachers Association (V.S.T.A.).

In the years 1994–2003, he was Director of Education Strategies in Melbourne.

In 1996, he undertook a strategic review of the Queensland Education Department for Minister Bob Quinn, focusing on organisation and curriculum at the senior policy level.

From 1997–2003, he consulted for the federally funded Discovering Democracy Civics and Citizenship Programme. Also in 1997 he was a member of the Victorian Board of Studies.

In 1998, he served as Executive Officer on the Internet-based "Achievers Against the Odds" Project that was jointly funded by the Rotary Districts of Victoria and the Victorian Department of Education. In the same year he was appointed as Director for the "I've Got the Power" anti-smoking youth programme funded by Philip Morris.

In the same year, he began an analysis of Mathematics, Science and English curriculum across a range of school systems, both national and international, as a benchmarking exercise for the Victorian Department of Education.

In 2000, he completed a comparative analysis of the New Zealand National Certificate of Educational Achievement for the NZ Education Forum and in 2002 and 2007 he carried out benchmarking work for the New Zealand school curriculum. In 2003 he consulted for the Commonwealth funded enquiry into boys’ education.

In the years 2004–05, Donnelly was Chief of Staff for the Hon. Kevin Andrews, the then Minister for Employment and Workplace Relations in the Federal government.

In 2005–06, he was a member of the steering committee for the federally funded enquiry into the Australian Certificate of Education and National Review of Year 12 subjects. In 2005 he also completed a Commonwealth funded project benchmarking primary intended curriculum documents in mathematics, science and English against overseas systems.

He was appointed Director for the Melbourne-based Education Strategies and Education Standards Institute in 2005 and from this period he became an active author and commentator on education. In 2013 he was appointed as Senior Research Fellow in the Faculty of Education and Arts at the Australian Catholic University in Melbourne.

In 2014, Donnelly and Kenneth Wiltshire were appointed by Christopher Pyne, Australia's federal education minister, as co-chairs to evaluate the Australian National Curriculum with special reference to the "robustness, independence and balance" being taught to Australian youth. They co-authored the 2014 review of the Australian National Curriculum.

In 2016, Donnelly wrote opinion pieces criticising the ideology of the "Safe Schools" programme.

== Award ==
- 2016: Member of the Order of Australia "for significant service to education as a researcher and author, to national curriculum development, and to professional organisations".

== Select bibliography ==
=== Books by Kevin Donnelly ===
- Why Our Schools are Failing (also titled: Why Our Schools are Failing: What Parents Need to Know about Australian Education, Potts Point, N.S.W.: Duffy & Snellgrove, 2004.
- Dumbing Down: Outcomes-Based and Politically Correct: The Impact of the Culture Wars on Our Schools, South Yarra, Victoria: Hardie Grant, 2007.
- Australia's Education Revolution: How Kevin Rudd Won and Lost the Education Wars, Ballan, Victoria: Connor Court Publishing, 2009.
- Educating Your Child: It's Not Rocket Science, Ballan, Victoria: Connor Court Publishing, 2012.
- Taming the Black Dog, Ballarat, Victoria: Connor Court Publishing, 2014.
- Dumbing Down, Browns Plains: Australian eBook Publisher, 2014.
- The Culture of Freedom, Melbourne: Institute of Public Affairs, 2016 (Monographs on Western Civilisation, No. 5).
- Regulation and Funding of Independent Schools: Lessons from Australia, Vancouver: Fraser Institute, 2017.
- How Political Correctness is Destroying Australia, Melbourne: Wilkinson Publishing, 2018.
- How Political Correctness is Destroying Education and Your Child’s Future, Melbourne: Wilkinson Publishing, 2018.
- A Politically Correct Dictionary and Guide, Redland Bay, Queensland: Connor Court, 2019.
- How Political Correctness Is Still Destroying Australia, Melbourne: Wilkinson Publishing, 2020.
- Cancel Culture and the Left's Long March, Melbourne: Wilkinson Publishing, 2021.
- The Dictionary of Woke: How Orwellian Language Control And Group Think Are Destroying Western Societies, Melbourne: Wilkinson Publishing, 2022.
- Wake Up to Woke: It's Time Australia, Self-published, 2024.

=== Articles by Kevin Donnelly ===
- "Exploding the Literary Canon", The Weekend Australian, 8–9 October 2005, p. 23.
- "The Muffled Canon", The Weekend Australian, 22–23 April 2006, p. 20.
- "Australia's Adoption of Outcomes Based Education: A Critique", Issues in Educational Research, 17(2), January 2007, pp. 183–206.
- "A Canon We Can't Afford to Overlook", The Australian, 9 August 2007, p. 14.
- "School Choice in Australia: An Overview of the Rules and Facts", Journal of School Choice, 6(2), April 2012, pp. 290–294.
- "Review of the Australian Curriculum: A View from a Member of the Review Team", Curriculum Perspectives, 35(1), April 2015, pp. 8–19.
- "The Australian Education Union: A History of Opposing School Choice and School Autonomy Down-Under", Journal of School Choice, 9(4), October 2015, pp. 626–641.
- "Counteroffensive on the Western Front", Quadrant, 21 March 2017.
- "The Betrayal of Education and Principle", Quadrant, 3 August 2017.
- "Cultural Left has Targeted Education For Decades". Daily Telegraph. 6 April 2018.
- "Religion Belongs in Schools", Quadrant, 11 April 2018.
- "The Price of Not Mentioning the Truth", Catholic Weekly, 18 April 2018.
- "Child-Led Learning has Dragged Australia Down". The Sydney Morning Herald. 25 April 2018.
- "Guaranteeing a Generation of Dolts", Quadrant, 2 May 2018.
- "The West is Lost and Our Unis Founder in Farce", The Australian, 11 June 2018, p. 14.
