= Australian Certificate of Education =

The Australian Certificate of Education (ACE) is the name of a proposed national senior secondary school certificate to replace the various existing Australian state and territory certificates in the upcoming Australian Curriculum. The scheme was considered by the Australian state and territory education ministers within the Australian Qualifications Framework. "Credentialling, and related assessment requirements and processes, will remain the responsibility of states and territories" – quote from the NSW Board of Studies website (which contradicts this proposed ACE).

The acronym "ACE" is already used for other educational purposes in Australia – the Australian College of Educators and Adult and Community Education.

== Development ==
In June 2005, the Australian Government commissioned the Australian Council for Educational Research (ACER), led by Professor Geoff Masters to investigate and report on models for a nationwide Australian Certificate of Education. The report was published in May 2006.

The report proposed the creation, in stages, of a national Australian Certificate of Education to replace the current state and territory certificates. It also proposed that the certificate be awarded by state and territory authorities (the ACACA agencies), based on nationally consistent standards set by a national standards body.

== Current certificates ==
The state and territory senior secondary school certificates are:

- NSW: Higher School Certificate (HSC)
- VIC: Victorian Certificate of Education (VCE), Victorian Certificate of Applied Learning (VCAL)
- QLD: Queensland Certificate of Education (QCE), Queensland Certificate of Individual Achievement (QCIA)
- SA: South Australian Certificate of Education (SACE)
- WA: Western Australian Certificate of Education (WACE)
- TAS: Tasmanian Certificate of Education (TCE)
- ACT: Australian Capital Territory Senior Secondary Certificate (ACT SSC)
- NT: Northern Territory Certificate of Education and Training (NTCET)

Some schools choose to offer the International Baccalaureate Diploma Programme (IB) as a recognised alternative.

== See also ==
- National Curriculum (Australia)
