= Victorian Institute of Teaching =

The Victorian Institute of Teaching (VIT) is an independent statutory authority whose task is to recognise and regulate members of the teaching profession in Victoria, Australia. The Institute registers teachers working in all schools in Victoria.

== See also ==
- Teaching in Victoria
- Education in Victoria
- Department of Education
- Quango
