= Ultranet =

Ultranet can refer to one of the following:

- Ultranet (company), a former telecommunications firm in Massachusetts, United States
- Ultranet (math), a term in topology
- Ultranet (powerline), a HVDC-project in Germany
- Ultranet (product), an online environment developed by the Department of Education and Early Childhood Development in Victoria, Australia
