= X6 =

X6 or X-6 may refer to:

== Arts, entertainment, and media ==
- Mega Man X6, the sixth video game in the Mega Man X series

== Electronics ==
- Nokia X6 (disambiguation), multiple touchscreen smartphones
- Roland Fantom X6, a synthesizer

== Transportation ==
=== Aircraft ===
- Airbus Helicopters X6, a proposed 19-seat twin-engined heavy lift helicopter
- Convair X-6, a proposed nuclear-powered aircraft
- Draganflyer X6, a commercial unmanned aerial vehicle

=== Automobiles ===
- Austin X6, a British mid-size sedan
- Beijing X6, a Chinese mid-size SUV
- Bestune X6, a Chinese compact concept SUV
- BMW X6, a German mid-size luxury SUV
- Forthing Jingyi X6, a Chinese mid-size crossover
- Geely Yuanjing X6, a Chinese compact SUV
- Landwind X6, a Chinese mid-size SUV
- Sehol X6, a Chinese compact SUV

=== Motorcycles ===
- Suzuki X6, a Japanese motorcycle

=== Routes ===
- X6 (New York City bus), a bus route in New York City, New York, United States

=== Trains ===
- LSWR X6 class, a British locomotive
- SJ X6, a Swedish trainset

== See also ==
- 6X (disambiguation)
