= Curriculum and Standards Framework =

School curriculum in Victoria, Australia

The Curriculum and Standards Framework (CSF) was developed for teachers Victoria, Australia. It was introduced in Victorian schools in 1995 and republished in 2000 as the CSF II. It was superseded by the Victorian Essential Learning Standards (VELS) program in 2006.

The CSF described what students in Victorian schools should know and be able to do in eight key areas of learning at regular intervals from the primary and secondary levels of education — specifically, from year Prep ('Preparatory') to Year 10. It provided sufficient detail for schools and the community to be clear about the major elements of the curriculum and the standards expected of successful learners.

The eight key learning areas were the Arts, English, Health and Physical Education, Languages Other Than English (LOTE), Mathematics, Science, Studies of Society and Environment (SOSE) and Technology. A document, the ESL Companion to the English CSF was also part of the project - it describes stages of English as a second language development. This latter document was an important part of the csf, acknowledging the teaching and assessment needs of the many students learning English as a second or additional language.

== VELS to replace CSF ==
The Victorian Essential Learning Standards (VELS) will progressively replace the Curriculum and Standards Framework as the basis for curriculum and assessment in Victorian schools from 2006.

== See also ==
- Education in Victoria
- Victorian Curriculum and Assessment Authority
