= Virtual School Victoria =

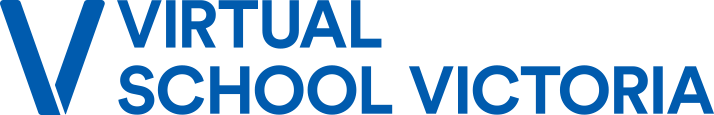

Location
- 315 Clarendon Street; Thornbury, Victoria, Australia
- Coordinates: 37°45′42″S 145°1′34″E

Information
- Type: Public (distance education)
- Founded: 1909
- Principal: Fiona Webster
- Staff: 160
- Enrolment: 5492 (2024)
- Website: https://www.vsv.vic.edu.au/

Virtual School Victoria (VSV) (formerly Distance Education Centre Victoria) is an F–12 school in Thornbury, Victoria. With an annual enrolment of approx 5500 from Foundation to Year 12, VSV is one of the largest state government school in Victoria.

The school is split into two sub-schools:

- F–10 sub-school, which handles students from Foundation to Year 10
- Year 11/12 sub-school, which handles students from Years 11 and 12 (including VCE and VCAL)

VSV offers two primary forms of enrollment direct students and students from other schools.

== Work ==
The school uses blended learning, a mix of virtual and face-to-face teaching and learning. Students can visit the school during normal school hours to meet with teachers, attend seminars and study in the library or purpose-built study areas. School-assessed coursework and other testing material is typically mailed out to students whilst Victorian Curriculum and Assessment Authority exams and General Achievement Test are held on-site under staff supervision. For students enrolled from other schools they will complete their GAT at their home school during the course of normal study with VCAA exams sent out to be completed at the home school. VSV does provide to students a majority of all non-language unit 3 and 4 VCE subjects through distance education

== See also ==
- Distance education
- E-learning
- Educational technology
