= Achievement Improvement Monitor =

The Achievement Improvement Monitor (AIM) program was a testing scheme used to monitor the development of literacy and numeracy skills of school students in Victoria, Australia.

The program was administered by the Victorian Curriculum and Assessment Authority (VCAA). Reading, writing, spelling and numeracy tests, based on the Victorian Essential Learning Standards (VELS), were undertaken by all Victorian students in Years 3, 5, 7 and 9. The results were used as feedback and guidance to students, parents and teachers, and were not used to grade students.

Schools and parents were advised of each student's results against VELS. At each test point, teachers could identify students who would benefit from enrichment activities or who may require further development in specific aspects of the curriculum.

In 2008, the Australia-wide NAPLAN tests replaced the AIM program.
