= Technological literacy =

Ability to use, manage, understand, and assess technology

Technological literacy (technology literacy) is the ability to use, manage, understand, and assess technology. Technological literacy is related to digital literacy in that when an individual is proficient in using computers and other digital devices to access the Internet, digital literacy gives them the ability to use the Internet to discover, review, evaluate, create, and use information via various digital platforms, such as web browsers, databases, online journals, magazines, newspapers, blogs, and social media sites.

== UNESCO and technology literacy ==
UNESCO (United Nations Educational, Scientific and Cultural Organization) strives to bring technology literacy to students throughout the world by ensuring educators are using technology in every aspect of their teaching. The more students are familiar not only with learning about technology but learning with technology, the more they will be prepared to use technology to improve their lives.

An entire module in their 2011 publication ICT Competency Framework for Teachers focuses on Technology Literacy in the classroom. This publication was updated in 2018 to reflect evolving ICT competencies (Information and Communications Technology). The framework has been used worldwide to develop ICT in education policy, teacher standards, assessment criteria, curriculum design and course-ware development. A highlight in the updated publication shows how the Technology Literacy module was put into action in an ICT in Education curriculum for a bachelor's degree by a university in Latin America and the Caribbean Region, and an associate degree offered by local teacher training colleges. Technology Literacy is the focus of the associate degree and the first two years of the bachelor's degree in Education. Some of the skills and knowledge taught in the program are how to operate computer hardware, learn the terminology and function of hardware components and peripherals (e.g. laptops, printers, storage), and how to troubleshoot if a computer is not working. These all lead to overcoming apprehension or fear of using technology. Another focus topic is word processing, which includes how a word processor operates, how it differs from a typewriter, how to use word processor software on computers, how to format documents, and how to check grammar and spelling.

In 2016, UNESCO detailed how teachers can show Technology Literacy in their classrooms when providing ICT education. Teachers will:

- describe and demonstrate the basic tasks and uses of word processors, such as text entry, editing text, formatting text and printing, describe and demonstrate the purpose and basic features of presentation software and other digital resources.
- describe the purpose and basic function of graphic software and use a graphic software package to create a simple graphic display.
- describe the Internet and the World Wide Web, elaborate on their uses, and describe how a browser works and use URL to access a website, use a search engine.
- create an email account and use it for a sustained series of email correspondence, use common communication and collaboration technologies, such as (email), text messaging, video conferencing, and web-based collaboration and social environments.
- use networked record keeping software to take attendance, submit grades, and maintain student records.
- locate off-the-shelf packages, tutorial, drill and practice software and Web resources for their accuracy and alignment with Curriculum Standards and match them to the needs of specific students.

On May 9, 2019, the UNESCO Cairo Office began a technology literacy project to teach basic literacy skills, life skills, and legal empowerment to 150-200 illiterate women between the ages of 15 and 35 living in the Giza Governate.

== Sources ==
This article incorporates text from a free content work. Licensed under CC BY-SA 3.0 IGO (license statement/permission). Text taken from UNESCO ICT Competency Framework for Teachers, Version 3, 53-55, UNESCO, UNESCO. UNESCO Digital Library.

This article incorporates text from a free content work. Licensed under CC BY-SA 3.0 IGO (license statement/permission). Text taken from Diverse approaches to developing and implementing competency-based ICT training for teachers: a case study, 132, UNESCO Office Bangkok and Regional Bureau for Education in Asia and the Pacific, UNESCO. UNESCO Digital Library.
