= 6X =

6X or 6-X may refer to:

- 6X, a brand of beer by Wadworth Brewery
- 6x, or six times in multiplication
- Saab 9-6X
- Alberta Highway 6X; see List of Alberta provincial highways
- Six Men Getting Sick (Six Times), film
- 6X, the production code for the 1985 Doctor Who serial The Mark of the Rani

== Aircraft ==
- Dassault Falcon 6X, a business jet
- SZD-6X Nietoperz, a Polish experimental glider
- Piper 6X; see Piper PA-32
- A/MH-6X, a model of Boeing AH-6

== See also ==
- X6 (disambiguation)
- 6S (disambiguation)
