= Victorian Tertiary Admissions Centre =

- Abbreviation: VTAC
- Formation: 1967
- Purpose: Higher-education application processing
- Location(s): Melbourne CBD, Victoria Australia
- Region served: Victoria, Australia
- Key people: Teresa Tjia (Chief Executive Officer)
- Website: www.vtac.edu.au
- Formerly called: Victorian Universities Admissions Committee (VUAC)

The Victorian Tertiary Admissions Centre (VTAC) is an independent shared admissions service facilitating access to tertiary education and further study opportunities and pathways for learners in Victoria and beyond. Formed in 1967 and incorporated as a company by limited guarantee in 2023, VTAC is a not-for-profit organisation and a member of the Australasian Conference of Tertiary Admission Centres (ACTAC).

== History ==
Before 1967, all universities in Victoria had their own application systems, and students can only directly apply to them. To simplify this process, VTAC was formed in 1967 by three Victorian universities: The University of Melbourne, Monash University and La Trobe University as the Victorian Universities Admissions Committee (VUAC). They started coordinating offers of places to students for the first time in the 1968 academic year.

In 1972, VUAC was expanded to include processing applications for the then four members of the Victoria Institute of Colleges: the Physiotherapy School of Victoria, the Royal Melbourne Institute of Technology, the Swinburne College of Technology, and the Victorian School of Speech Science. In 1986, it was renamed to its current name.

== Application system ==
=== Course requirements ===
All courses listed on VTAC have their own prerequisites and requirements, which are published on the CourseSearch website.

Most courses will require a minimum ATAR before an offer is even considered. Some institutions publish a guaranteed ATAR, where if the applicant achieves higher than the ATAR and preference appropriately they will be secured a place in their chosen course. For those who score between the minimum and guaranteed ATAR, personal statements will also be a part of the screening process. Not all courses judge their applicants solely using ATAR. Some courses require an audition or a folio, while some courses will require an admission test before applying, notably the University Clinical Aptitude Test (UCAT) (Note: Previously the Undergraduate Medicine and Health Sciences Admission Test (UMAT)) that is needed for undergraduate medicine/surgery courses. Other tests include:

- International Student Admissions Test (ISAT), for international students applying for Type 3 places in medicine/surgery courses at Monash University
- VETASSESS
- Casper, for initial teaching education courses

The ATAR profile for all undergraduate courses is also published on the VTAC website, acting as a guide for students if their score is enough for being considered for the course. A sample ATAR profile is as follows:

		ATAR (excluding adjustment factors)			Selection rank (ATAR plus any adjustment factors)		
Course code	Campus	Highest	Median	Lowest	Highest	Median	Lowest
1200345678	Melbourne	99.95	91.25	75.55	99.95	92.75	83.35

Where it indicates the student with the highest and lowest ATAR that was made an offer in the previous year, as well as the median ATAR of all students that entered the course. The right column shows the ATAR data after Special Entry Access Scheme (SEAS) adjustments.

=== Preferencing ===
VTAC processes applications from suitably qualified students, which may list up to 8 preferences for tertiary courses in the state of Victoria. Tertiary institutions determine whether the applicant is given the offer to undertake a course – VTAC then informs students of the highest preferred course they have been offered, if any. Universities do not consider the order of preferences when making offers, so all courses listed on an applicant's preferences will be treated equally and making sure that no applications are disadvantaged. Some courses have early closing dates, where after the date students will not be able to add them to their preferences. This mainly includes courses that require interviews or auditioning, particularly in areas such as medicine, music or fine arts.

After the release of VCE and ATAR results, applicants will still be able to adjust their preferences for a few days before the closure of the system. Students are able to change their preferences for any reasons, including a change of mind, adding a newly available course or if the course applied has been cancelled and needs replacement. There are no additional fees for change of preference, provided that they have already paid the application fee. After the release of offers for each round, the system will reopen to allow for preference adjustments before its closure again for the next offer round.

=== Special Entry Access Scheme (SEAS) ===
The Special Entry Access Scheme (SEAS) is the umbrella program run by most institutions to which students will be applying for courses through VTAC. There are four categories in SEAS. Students can apply for any categories they have experienced education disadvantages in, including:

- Category 1: Personal information and location. This category includes age, living or school location, under-represented gender in a course or field of study, recognition as an Indigenous Australian, from a non-English speaking background and being the first in the family to attend tertiary studies.
- Category 2: Disadvantaged financial background
- Category 3: Disability or medical condition
- Category 4: Difficult circumstances (including COVID-19 related difficulties)

Only the Selection Rank that is used to determine higher education applications will be adjusted after applying for SEAS, while the ATAR will remain unchanged. Different institutions may also have different methods of SEAS adjustment due to differences in the calculation method, and the under-represented groups in each course are different.

=== Offers ===
There are two types of intake: the Semester 1 intake and the mid-year intake. Not all institutions participate in the mid-year intake, and is a less popular option due to Australia having its academic year starting in January.

There are many offer rounds for the Semester 1 intake, which most high school leavers apply to.

- November round offer, only available to non-year 12 applicants
- December round offer, new in 2019, only for applicants who have already received their ATAR (Current students in Victoria, New South Wales and ACT)
- January round offer, for all other applicants (including students completing the IB Diploma)
- Multiple subsequent offer rounds in January through March, for New Zealand applicants and applicants who have received a better preference

Note: Domestic and international applicants receive offers at different dates

Students can only receive one offer in each round, with the option to accept, defer or decline. An offer from a course with a higher preference can be received in subsequent offer rounds. However, it is strongly recommended not to decline as it is not guaranteed that an offer from a higher preference can be received, and students are allowed to withdraw from their previous offer if they change their mind. For domestic applicants who stil have not receive any offers after the first February round offer, they may receive a supplementary offer from courses they did not list on the preference list but have vacant places, provided that they had given the permission to release their application to all courses with vacancies.

== Score calculation ==
VTAC is responsible for calculating VCE study score scaling and ATAR, and releasing the results to students online on the VCE Results and ATAR Service by coordinating with the Victorian Curriculum and Assessment Authority (VCAA).

=== VCE scaling ===
Scaling is the process that adjusts VCE study scores into ATAR subject scores. The Victorian Tertiary Admissions Centre (VTAC) adjusts all VCE study scores to equalise results between studies with stronger cohorts, and those with weaker ones. Contrary to common perception, scaling is not based on the difficulty of the subject, as each study score is in fact a ranking. The score adjustment ensures that in those subjects where it is easier to overtake the cohort, the score is adjusted downward, while in subjects where it is difficult to score highly, it is moved upwards. This makes sure obtaining the average score in one study required the same level of achievement as every other study.

Mathematics subjects and language subjects have additional scaling rules. In mathematics subjects (General Mathematics, Mathematical Methods and Specialist Mathematics), all three studies are scaled against each other in addition to being scaled against all other studies, then the higher of the two scaling scores will then be used. This is due to mathematics having a distinct hierarchy of studies with varying difficulties, so students studying the harder subjects will not be disadvantaged by the level of difficulty. In LOTE (Languages Other Than English) subjects, study scores are adjusted by adding up to five to the initial scaled study score average. This adjustment is different for each subject and score, and decreases as the study score moves away from 30.

=== ATAR calculation ===
ATAR in Victoria is calculated by the Victorian Tertiary Admissions Centre (VTAC) every year using student results provided by the Victorian Curriculum and Assessment Authority (VCAA). VTAC will combine the student's results into an "aggregate" which is a sum of selected (scaled) results from eligible subjects:

- the student's best score in one of English, English Language, Literature, or English as an Additional Language (EAL),
- the student's next three best scores; along with the English score form the "primary four" results,
- 10% of the next two best scores, known as "increments" (where available).

The aggregates, which can range from 0 to, theoretically, over 220, are then mapped to percentiles for conversion to an ATAR. Students must pass an English subject in order to qualify for an ATAR as well as the Victorian Certificate of Education (VCE). The primary four results must be taken from VCE or Vocational Education and Training (VET) Units 3 and 4 sequences, while the increments can also include other results, such as interstate study or university extension studies. There are also other rules, such as only two studies from the same subject area can contribute to the "primary 4". For example, if the student completed Unit 3/4 for all General Mathematics, Mathematical Methods, and Specialist Mathematics, the one with the lowest study score must be an increment, even if the score is higher than all other studies outside of mathematics.

The group of students with the highest aggregates will be assigned the highest ATAR of 99.95. ATARs below 30.00 are reported as "less than 30" on printed ATAR statements, however the actual ATAR is available online.

View source data.

== Participating institutions ==
As of 2024, VTAC acts on behalf of 12 universities in Australia, located in Victoria (or interstate universities with campuses in Victoria):

- Australian Catholic University
- Charles Sturt University
- CQUniversity
- Deakin University
- Federation University Australia
- La Trobe University
- Monash University
- RMIT University
- Swinburne University of Technology
- The University of Melbourne
- Torrens University Australia
- Victoria University

VTAC also administers applications on behalf of many other tertiary education institutes, including TAFEs and independent tertiary colleges.

Participating institutions
Academy of Interactive Entertainment	JMC Academy
Academy of Interactive Technology	Kangan Institute
Australian College of Applied Professions	La Trobe College Australia
AIBI Higher Education	LCI Melbourne
Australian Institute of Music (AIM)	Marcus Oldham College
Box Hill Institute	Melbourne Institute of Technology
Cairnmillar Institute	Melbourne Polytechnic
CG Spectrum Institute	Monash College
Chisholm Institute	Northern College of the Arts and Technology
Collarts (Australian College of the Arts)	Open Universities Australia
Deakin College	Ozford Institute of Higher Education
Eastern College Australia	Photography Studies College
Elly Lukas Beauty Therapy College	SAE Creative Media Institute
Endeavour College of Natural Health	Southern Cross Education Institute Higher Education
endota Wellness College	The Gordon
Holmesglen	Victorian Institute of Technology
Holmes Institute	William Angliss Institute

== See also ==
- Australian Tertiary Admission Rank
- Victorian Certificate of Education
- General Achievement Test
- List of state-level unified TACs (Tertiary Admission Center), domestic students must apply once to the relevant TAC for admission to all the universities within that state.
- Tertiary education in Australia
