= 6S =

6S may stand for:

== Business and management ==
- 6S, a modification of the 5S methodology which includes "Safety" as the 6th S. It is a lean process improvement tool that stands for Sort, Set in Order (a.k.a. Straighten or Stabilize), Shine (a.k.a. Scrub or Sweep), Standardize, Sustain, Safety.
- 6S can be the shortened form of Six Sigma
- 6S Methodology, a workplace organizational method

== Music ==
- 6S (music), key signature of six sharps

== Science and technology ==
- 6S (radiative transfer code), a computer program that simulates the reflection of solar radiation
- 6S / SsrS RNA, the first noncoding RNA to be sequenced
- iPhone 6S, a smartphone by Apple, Inc.
- 6s, possible value in electron configuration § Notation

== Television ==
- 6S, the production code for the 1984 Doctor Who serial The Twin Dilemma

== Transportation ==
- Kato Airline, a Norwegian airline with an IATA airline designator of 6S from 1996 to 2008
- Sahara Airlines (Algeria), an Algerian airline with an IATA airline designator of 6S from 1999 to 2003
- British Rail Class 201 diesel-electric multiple units with 6 coaches and a short frame (6S)

== See also ==
- 6 (disambiguation)
- S6 (disambiguation)
- 6X (disambiguation)
