= Victorian Essential Learning Standards =

School curriculum in Victoria, Australia

In the state of Victoria, Australia, the Victorian Essential Learning Standards (VELS) was the curriculum framework for Preparatory to Year 10 school levels, which replaced the Curriculum and Standards Framework II (CSF 2) in 2006. Students starting Year 11 normally proceed to complete the Victorian Certificate of Education (VCE), but other education options are available. VELS was superseded by the Australian Curriculum AusVELS in 2013.

== Breakdown of the VELS ==
The VELS is a curriculum framework providing a set of areas for teachers to teach. Like the Curriculum and Standards Framework (CSF) and the CSF II, the VELS has six levels, with a general expectation that each level be completed in two years of schooling, with the exception of Level 1, completed in the first year of Primary schooling, known as "Prep", as follows:

Primary School Level

- Level 1 - Preparatory
- Level 2 - Years 1 and 2
- Level 3 - Years 3 and 4
- Level 4 - Years 5 and 6

Secondary School Level

- Level 5 - Years 7 and 8
- Level 6 - Years 9 and 10

The following is a list of teaching areas in the VELS (domains), which are sorted further into dimensions. Each domain belongs to one of three strands: Physical, Personal and Social Learning, Discipline-based Learning or Interdisciplinary Learning. The idea is for these three strands to be woven together to give a balanced education so that students will succeed in further education, work and life. The three strands are represented graphically by a triple-helix inspired diagram.

== Physical, Personal and Social Learning ==
=== Health and Physical Education ===
Standards at levels 1,2,3,4,5 and 6

Dimensions:

- Movement and physical activity
- Health knowledge and promotion

=== Interpersonal Development ===
Standards at levels 1,2,3,4,5 and 6

Dimensions:

- Building social relationships
- Working in teams

=== Personal Learning ===
Standards at levels 3,4,5,6

Dimensions:

- The individual learner
- Managing personal learning

=== Civics and Citizenship ===
Standards at levels 3, 4, 5 and 6. Civics and Citizenship aims to teach students what it means to be citizens in a democracy.

Dimensions:

- Civil knowledge and understanding: Concepts such as political and legal systems are introduced, and basic history relating to Australian politics is covered.
- Community engagement: This is a hands-on approach to developing skills related to living and existing in a community. Students will engage in group activities, and make decisions while applying their knowledge of the concepts of democracy and the rules of governance. Students learn to look at issues objectively and give opinions on local and global issues.

== Discipline-based Learning ==
=== The Arts ===
Standards at levels 1, 2, 3, 4, 5 and 6

Dimensions:

- Creating and making
- Exploring and responding

=== English ===
Standards at levels 1,2,3,4,5 and 6.

Dimensions:

- Reading
- Writing
- Speaking and listening

=== The Humanities ===
Standards at levels 3, 4, 5 and 6

The Humanities discipline is organised into four domains:

The Humanities – (Levels 1–3)

Dimensions:

- Humanities knowledge and understanding
- Humanities skills

The Humanities – Economics (Levels 4–6)

Dimensions:

- Economics knowledge and understanding
- Economics reasoning and interpretation

The Humanities – Geography (Levels 4–6)

Dimensions:

- Geographical knowledge and understanding
- Geospatial skills

The Humanities – History (Levels 4–6)

Dimensions:

- Historical knowledge and understanding
- Historical reasoning and interpretation

=== LOTE (Languages other than English) ===
Dimensions:

- Communicating in a language other than English
- Intercultural knowledge and language awareness.

LOTE has two pathways:

Pathway 1 - for students who begin learning a language in primary school and continue to study the same language to Year 10.

- Standards at levels 4, 5 and 6

Pathway 2 - for students who begin learning a language in Year 7.

- Standards at levels 5 and 6

=== Mathematics ===
Standards at levels 1,2,3,4,5 and 6

Dimensions:

- Number
- Space
- Measurement, chance and data
- Structure
- Working mathematically

=== Science ===
Standards at levels 3, 4, 5 and 6

Dimensions:

- Science knowledge and understanding
- Science at work

== Interdisciplinary Learning ==
=== Communication ===
Standards at levels 4, 5 and 6.

The Communication domain focuses on developing students who communicate clearly and confidently both at school and for further education and life.

Dimensions:

- Listening, viewing and responding: Students learn how to listen, view and respond to content. Students are taught conventions in communication, strategies in communication and familiarity with different forms of content presentation.
- Presenting: Students are taught how to present information in a coherent and appropriate manner for the situation, and to understand formats of presentation.

=== Design, Creativity and Technology ===
Standards at levels 3, 4, 5 and 6.

Design, Creativity and Technology aims to encourage students to think laterally and openly to design, produce and evaluate solutions to problems.

Dimensions:

- Investigating and designing: Students identify problems and develop and use design briefs (summaries of the problem and specifications). Students research and investigate relevant information about the problem and resources (for example materials, tools and equipment), processes, and represent and plan production of possible solutions.
- Producing: Students produce their solution for the problem, learning how to safely use tools, equipment and materials (such as food, wood, metal, plastics and textiles) and electrical and/or mechanical components to make a system.
- Analysing and evaluating: This involves students testing and evaluating the effectiveness of the solution they have produced and the impacts of their own and others’ products.

=== Information and Communications Technology ===
Standards at levels 2, 3, 4, 5 and 6

Dimensions:

- ICT for visualising thinking
- ICT for creating
- ICT for communicating

=== Thinking Processes ===
Standards at levels 3, 4, 5 and 6

Dimensions:

- Reasoning, processing and inquiry
- Creativity
- Reflection, evaluation and metacognition

== Intended aims of the VELS ==
- A curriculum that recognises what students need to know and be able to do to succeed in the world such as managing themselves as individuals and in relation to others; understanding the world in which they live; and acting effectively in that world.
- To provide clearer assessment and reporting strategies to better inform parents about student achievement.

== Changes to Victorian Standards ==
- The VELS is the third program to be introduced into Victoria in the past decade, with the CSF in 1995 and the CSF II in 2000. It builds on the CSF recognising that the CSF had many strengths. The CSF remains as a good curriculum resource to help teachers develop teaching and learning programs in the VELS.

== See also ==
- Curriculum and Standards Framework
- Curriculum framework
- Victorian Curriculum and Assessment Authority
