= Nokia X6 =

Nokia X6 can refer to

- Nokia X6-00, a Symbian^1 smartphone, announced in September 2009
- Nokia 6.1 Plus, an Android smartphone, announced in July 2018
