= Senior Secondary Certificate of Education =

School qualification offered in Australia

The Senior Secondary Certificate of Education (SSCE) is the graduation certificate awarded to most students in Australian high schools, and is equivalent to the Advance Placement in North America and the GCE A-Levels of the United Kingdom. Students completing the SSCE are usually aged 16 to 18 and study full-time for three years (years 10, 11 and 12 of schooling). In some states adults may gain the certificate through a Technical and Further Education college or other provider.

The curriculum, assessment and name of the SSCE is different in each state and territory. The government of each determines these themselves, although the curriculum must address mutually agreed national competencies.

State and territory SSCEs
| State | SSCE title | Abbreviation |
| New South Wales | Higher School Certificate Board Developed Course - ATAR Board Endorsed Course - Non-ATAR Content Endorsed Course - Non-ATAR Life Skills Course - Non-ATAR | HSC |
| Victoria | Victorian Certificate of Education - ATAR; Victorian Certificate of Applied Learning - Non-ATAR | VCE; VCAL |
| Queensland | Queensland Certificate of Education "Authority" Subjects - OP/ATAR "Authority-Registered" Subjects - Non-ATAR | QCE |
| South Australia | South Australian Certificate of Education | SACE |
| Western Australia | Western Australian Certificate of Education 2016 - present: "ATAR" and "General" Courses 2007 - 2015: Stage 2 and Stage 3 subjects (ATAR) 2007-2015: Preliminary and Stage 1 subjects (Non-ATAR) | WACE |
| Tasmania | Tasmanian Certificate of Education Level 3 - ATAR Level 1 and Level 2 subjects - Non-ATAR | TCE |
| Australian Capital Territory | ACT Senior Secondary Certificate and Record of Achievement "T" and "H" course Subjects - ATAR "A","V","M',"C","E" and "R" course Subjects - Non-ATAR | ACT SSC |
| Northern Territory | Northern Territory Certificate of Education | NTCE |

Universities Australia generates a nationally standardised final score for each SSCE exam student called the Australian Tertiary Admission Rank (ATAR). Universities and other Higher Education providers typically use this mark as the main criterion in selecting domestic students. All States and Territories in Australia uses the ATAR system. Queensland had its own ranking system called Overall Position (OP), but switched to ATAR in 2020.
