= Department of Education (Victoria) =

Government agency in Victoria, Australia

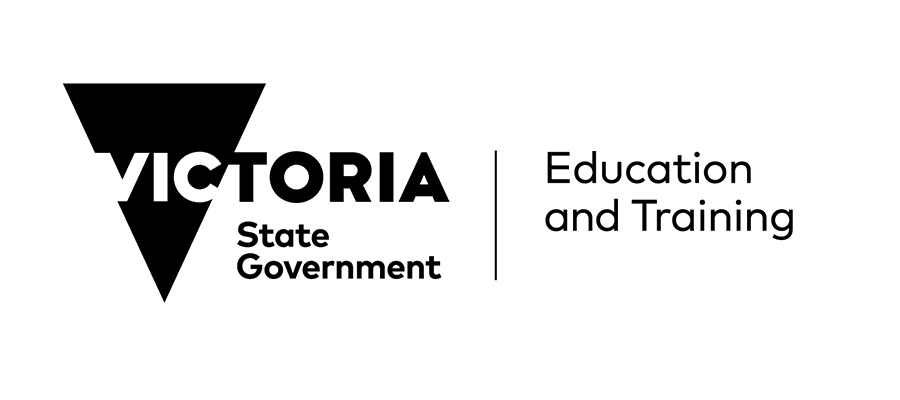
- Logo prior to January 2023

Department overview
- Formed: 14 July 1933
- Preceding Department: Department of Education and Training
- Jurisdiction: Victoria, Australia
- Minister responsible: Gabrielle Williams, Minister for Education
- Department executive: David Howes, Secretary
- Website: vic.gov.au/education
- Agency ID: PROV VA 5283

The Department of Education is a government department in Victoria, Australia.

== History ==
Victoria's Department of Education appointed its first director, Frank Tate in 1900, and it had begun to employ women graduates. Christina Montgomery was one of the first.

Formerly known as the Department of Education and Early Childhood Development until January 2015 and Department of Education and Training (DET) until January 2023, the department is responsible for the state's education system. Until January 2023, the department was also responsible for TAFE, training and higher education until these functions were transferred to the Department of Jobs, Skills, Industry and Regions.

On the 24th of March, 2026, 30,000 Victorian teachers and support staff have chosen to strike over a pay dispute with the government.

== Ministers ==
As of October 2023, the department supports two ministers in the following portfolios:

Name	Party	Portfolio
Ben Carroll	Labor	Minister for Education
Lizzie Blandthorn	Labor	Minister for Children

== Functions ==
The department has responsibility for the following policy areas:

- Early childhood development
- Primary education
- Secondary education

== Agencies ==
Agencies under the DE's portfolios include:

- Adult, Community and Further Education Board
- AMES
- Centre for Adult Education
- Children's Services Coordination Board
- Disciplinary Appeals Boards
- Merit Protection Boards
- Victorian Curriculum and Assessment Authority
- Victorian Institute of Teaching
- Victorian Registration and Qualifications Authority
- Victorian School Building Authority

== See also ==
- Special Assistance Program
- Safe Schools Coalition Australia § Victoria
- Ultranet (product)
- VELS
- Victorian Certificate of Education
- Victorian Certificate of Applied Learning
- Victorian Curriculum and Assessment Authority
