= Engage Education Foundation =

Australian not-for-profit organization

- Founded: 2010
- Type: Educational non-profit
- Purpose: Educational inequality and accessibility
- Location: Carlton, Victoria, Australia
- Services: Engage Wiki, Practice Exams, Seminars
- Key people: Eloise Watson, Chairperson; Jake Miller-Randle, CEO; Jun Martin, CFO
- Employees: 115 (2014)

Engage Education Foundation or 'Engage' is an Australia-based not for profit organisation that provides educational resources to students. Founded in 2010, the organisation is run by young people aged 18 to 25, and overseen by an advisory board.

Their programs include subject revision seminars attended by 7000 students annually and the recently launched free Engage Wiki. The Engage Wiki is an online educational resource that was launched in 2015 and provides explanatory videos, notes and practice exams across a range of VCE subjects.

== History ==
Founded in 2010 by students from the University of Melbourne, Engage Education initially ran VCE revision lectures and tutoring. Since then, Engage has entered the field of digital education. All of its services now use the digital education revolution as a means to reduce the barriers to accessible education.

== Programs ==
=== Engage Wiki ===
The Engage Wiki is an online educational initiative that launched in 2015. The website provides explanatory videos, notes and exams in a range of VCE subjects. In 2015, Engage's free practice exams registered 120,000 unique downloads.

=== VCE Lectures ===
In July and September, annually, Engage runs VCE revision lectures at The University of Melbourne.
