= Academy of Interactive Technology =

Higher education provider in Sydney

AIT – Academy of Interactive Technology
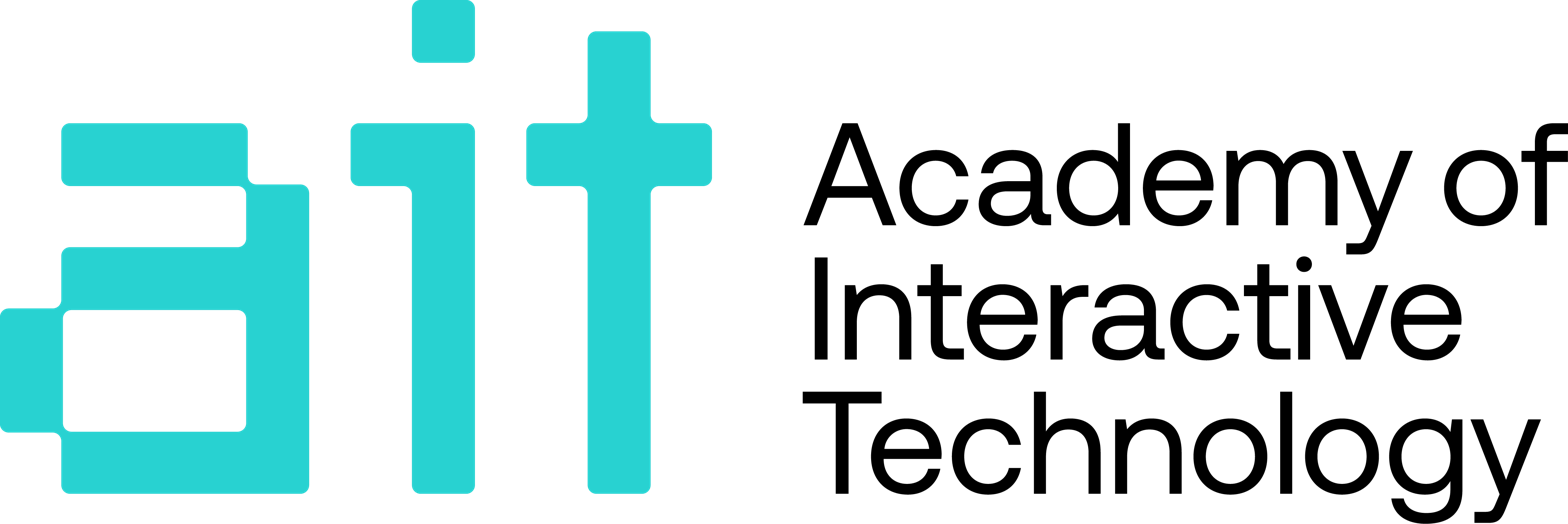
- Other name: AIT
- Former name: Academy of Information Technology
- Established: 1999
- Officer in charge: Glenn Elith
- Location: Level 2, 7 Kelly Street, Sydney, 2007, Australia; 33.8819°S 151.1953°E
- Website: www.ait.edu.au

AIT, Academy of Interactive Technology (formerly known as the Academy of Information Technology) is a specialist higher education and vocational education institution based in Sydney, with a second campus opening in Melbourne, Australia in 2015. AIT was established in 1999, and specialises in three disciplines: digital media, information technology, and business. AIT is a member of the NextEd group, alongside Greenwich English College, Go Study Australia, and the International School of Colour and Design (ISCD). AIT was the first in Australia to offer courses in Motion capture technology, and has the latest markerless Motion Capture system installed in its Sydney campus, in 2013, AIT was still the first Mobile Applications Development course provided. AIT holds and participates in many events, including the AIT Oscar Night, the AIT Games Night, and the Vivid Light Festival.

AIT is recognised as a quality tertiary education provider by the Australian Government's Tertiary Education Quality & Standards Agency (TEQSA) and the Australian Skills Quality Authority (ASQA).

== Courses ==
2D & 3D Animation

- Bachelor of Interactive Media (Specialisation: Animation)
- Diploma of Digital Media Technologies (Specialisation: Animation)

Design

- Bachelor of Interactive Media (Specialisation: Design)
- Diploma of Digital Media Technologies (Specialisation: Design)

Film Making

- Bachelor of Interactive Media (Specialisation: Film Making)
- Diploma of Digital Media Technologies (Specialisation: Film Making)

Game Design

- Bachelor of Interactive Media (Specialisation: Game Development)
- Diploma of Digital Media Technologies (Specialisation: Game Development)

Digital Design

- Bachelor of Digital Design
- Diploma of Design

IT

- Bachelor of IT (Mobile Applications Development)
- Diploma of Software Development

== Facilities ==
=== Motion capture ===
The motion capture (or organic motion) is a markerless motion capture system that was designed and manufactured by Organic Motion of New York. This type of technology was the first of its kind implemented in Australia. The Motion Capture, a.k.a. MoCap, allows users to motion track and animate their 3D characters easily.

=== Green Screen Room ===
The Green Screen Room is a state of the art filming environment located on the Sydney campus. The space was launched on 28 May 2014 and allows students to extend their editing skills in Adobe Premiere and Adobe After Effects for Green Screen compositing.

== Controversies ==
=== Wage underpayment ===
In 2019 the Academy of Information Technology (AIT) admitted to its staff that they "may" have been paying casual educators below the Award rate. The National Tertiary Education Union (NTEU) estimated around 40 casual employees are affected by underpayment, which in some cases has employees receiving less than 50% of the Award rate for lectures. The underpayment case was settled for around $2million dollars for 83 current and former staff. CEO Glenn Elith apologised for the underpayment: "AIT sincerely regrets the underpayments of its valued and hard-working staff. AIT is committed to ensuring all staff are fully compensated and properly paid in future. Upon becoming aware of this matter, AIT’s academic staff were immediately informed and the company worked quickly to determine the back-payments required. AIT has been grateful for the constructive approach taken by NTEU in this matter, and respects its strong advocacy for their members.”

== Student council and social activities ==
=== Student Representative Council ===
The AIT Student Representative Council (SRC) logo

The Student Representative Council (SRC) is a small group of students selected by the student body. Their job is to help improve the quality of life on the AIT campus, and do so by communicating with teachers and staff members on the student bodies behalf. The current president of the SRC is Mikhaila Katte.

=== Clubs ===
As of 2015 AIT currently has five clubs running: the 3D Club, Film Club, Drawing Club, Table Top Club and Fight Club. These clubs are overseen and assisted by the SRC.

=== Events ===
AIT holds regular events throughout the year, held by a mixture of staff members, teachers and the SRC. Smaller events include barbecues, Christmas parties and Trivia Nights.

==== AIT Oscar Night ====
The AIT Oscar Night is an annual event held at AIT. This event allows student works to be recognised and rewarded by their teacher and peers in the fields of Animation and Film. The event is run by Film Coordinator, Patrick Huang.

==== AIT Games Night ====
The AIT Games Night is an annual event held at AIT. This event features student games alongside other activities like cosplay competitions. Prizes are awarded to the best student games. This event is run by both the teachers and SRC, allowing multiple activities to run in one night.

==== .ink Student Art Exhibition ====
The .ink Student Art Exhibition is an annual event held off campus that celebrates the traditional art, digital illustrations, digital design, concept art, photography and promotional products students have produced.

==== Vivid ====
In 2015 AIT participated in the Vivid Light Festival. Their entry, titled "Lightwell", was a collaborative task between teachers and students. The structure itself was created by Helen Goritsas, Patrick Huang, Nik Sutila, Adam Katz, Sharon Sanders, Carlton Zhu, Kwan Chemsripong and Kriss Mahatumaratana. The interactive structure displayed a collection of student artworks onto a wall along Walsh Bay, Sydney.

== See also ==
- List of universities in Australia
