= 2026 Victorian teachers strike =

Labour Strike

The 2026 Victorian teacher's strike was a series of two strike actions in Victoria as part of the 2026 bargaining agreement between the Australian Education Union (AEU) and the Victorian State Government. The ultimate outcome of the strikes was a revised bargaining agreement from the government for a 28.3 per cent pay rise over four years and a lump sum payment of $2,000, with AEU members voting in favour of this revised pay deal.

Bargaining was initiated after the conclusion of the 2022 bargaining equipment, which negotiated an 8 per cent pay rise over four years.

On 17 March and after eight months of bargaining, the AEU rejected the government's pay offer of a 17 per cent pay increase over four years. The AEU's policy position was a 35 per cent pay increase over four years, arguing that Victorian teachers were the lowest paid teachers in the country. Due to this deadlock the AEU initiated the 24 March strike. The strike was held in front of the state parliament and other locations for regional teachers, including Wodonga. Victoria Police estimated that 35,000 teachers were in attendance within the CBD.

After re-negotiations with the AEU and the government, the AEU announced it had reached an in-principle agreement of a pay rise of between 28 and 32 per cent over four years, and more student free days. However this offer was rejected by AEU members, leading to the AEU initiating a second strike.

On 23 July AEU initiated a second strike in Melbourne CBD. Police estimated 20,000 people attended this rally. In response, the AEU and government agreed on a 28.3 per cent pay rise over four years and a lump sum payment of $2,000. On 17 August AEU members voted in favour of this revised pay deal, with the revised deal to be sent to all teachers to be voted on. A third strike was planned to occur on 19 August, but was cancelled. The Victorian Government Schools Agreement 2026 came into effect on 23 October 2026.
