= General Achievement Test =

School examination in Victoria, Australia

- Acronym: GAT
- Type: Paper-based standardised exam
- Administrator: Victorian Curriculum and Assessment Authority
- Skills tested: Writing, literacy, numeracy, reasoning
- Purpose: Assessing literacy and numeracy skills, quality assuring VCE assessments
- Year started: 1987 (pilot); 1992 (compulsory)
- Duration: Section A: 2 hours and 15 minutes Section B: 1 hour and 45 minutes
- Score range: 0-50 study scores (for students completing both sections)
- Offered: Annually
- Regions: Victoria, Australia (Note: Also internationally in selected schools that offers VCE including China, Malaysia, Philippines, Timor-Leste and Vietnam) (Note: Also in Western Australia from 2006 to 2007)
- Languages: English
- Used by: Victorian Tertiary Admissions Centre (VTAC) for VCE score moderation, universities (limited)
- Website: www.vcaa.vic.edu.au/assessment/vce-assessment/general-achievement-test

The General Achievement Test (often abbreviated GAT) is a test of general knowledge and skills including communication, mathematics, science and technology, the arts, humanities and social sciences in the Australian state of Victoria.

Although the GAT is not a part of the graduation requirements and does not count towards a student's final VCE results or ATAR, the GAT plays an important role in checking that a school's assessments and examinations have been accurately assessed.

== History ==
The General Achievement Test was introduced as a pilot program in 1987, designed to test the feasibility and effectiveness of a general test that assesses skills and knowledge that was not specific to any VCE subjects. After the successful pilot program, the GAT was fully implemented as a compulsory test for all Year 12 students studying for the Victorian Certificate of Education in 1992. The GAT has since then been conducted annually and remains an important part of the VCE assessment process.

From 2006 to 2007, Year 12 Western Australian students sat the GAT for a short period. This test was introduced into Western Australia as a trial to provide schools with feedback on the standard of assessment used for the new WACE courses. However, the results of the trial were inconclusive due to the test not being taken seriously by a large number of students, and a more sophisticated analysis than the initially suggested regression analysis was found to be required. Also, the renewed primacy of marks in scaling scores for WACE meant the original purpose for the GAT no longer existed. Therefore, in 2007 the Curriculum Council of Western Australia decided to discontinue the test after an independent review.

In 2007, Monash University began taking the GAT into consideration for middle band students. It was initially for Victorian students who missed out on courses because their ATAR score was just below the cut-off score. Currently, it is only considered if two students have the same ATAR, prerequisite study scores and are trying to get into the same course. Their GAT score can then be used to differentiate between one getting in and the other not.

In 2020, the GAT was rescheduled from June to October due to the COVID-19 pandemic, with masks being mandatory for all students undergoing the test.

These issues continued into 2021, with the GAT being rescheduled four separate times due to COVID lockdowns. In the lead-up, Victorian Education Minister James Merlino encouraged students in hotspot areas to receive COVID tests before sitting the GAT, uncovering 33 cases. After the exam was conducted, at least four positive cases were linked to students that attended.

Since 2022, the GAT had been split into two sections, and the total exam time was increased from 3 hours and 15 minutes to 4 hours. It also started explicitly reporting a student's literacy and numeracy skills against the new standards in addition to its original role in quality-assuring VCE assessments, bringing it in line with similar tests in other states and territories.

=== GATchphrase ===
In 2009, a student-organised movement headed by Lucas Shipsides and fuelled by Facebook brought the GAT to the attention of the national press, by suggesting that students make as many references to actor George Clooney as possible in their answers. This became known as "Project Clooney '09". Over 8,000 students are believed to have participated in the statewide prank/meme.

After this level of participation was observed, it became customary, as a form of parody/protest, to incorporate GAT catch phrases, or GATchphrases in the test in following years. In late April 2016 a poll was held on the VCE Discussion Space Facebook group to choose the "Gatchphrase" for that year. Over 1,500 votes were cast, with the theme of Shannon Noll was robbed of the 2003 Australian Idol title winning with over 1,000 votes. A public Facebook event page was created for the theme, and by the date of the GAT it had an attendance of over 3,600 students.

Year	GATchphrase
2009	George Clooney
2018	If the teacher doesn't arrive within 15 minutes students are legally allowed to leave
2019	I Got the Horses in the GAT
2020	GAT On The Beers

== Format ==
The GAT is delivered in two sections, held as two separate tests on the same day. Section A assesses literacy and numeracy. Section B assesses mathematics, science, technology, arts, and humanities. All senior secondary students in Victoria, including Senior VCAL students, sit in Section A. All students enrolled in one or more VCE Unit 3/4 subjects (including scored VCE VET) sit both Sections A and B.

Both sections of the GAT are done with pen and paper, with separate question booklets and answer booklets. After the examination, students are allowed to bring the question booklet home. No prior study is needed, as past studies in English, mathematics, science and history already prepare students for the test by building their knowledge and skills in writing, numeracy, and reasoning.

=== Section A: Literacy and numeracy skills ===
Section A is a two-hour Literacy and Numeracy test with 15 minutes of reading time (2 hours and 15 minutes in total), composed of:

- 2 literacy writing tasks – 30 minutes total
  - Short-answer type writing – 10 minutes
  - Detailed response writing – 20 minutes
- 100 multiple-choice questions – 90 minutes total
  - 50 numeracy multiple-choice questions – 45 minutes
  - 50 reading multiple-choice questions – 45 minutes

Note: Time for each part are suggestions only. Students are free to spend more or less time on any other parts in Section A.

In the writing tasks, students are presented with images and/or texts and asked to respond to 2 prompts. Students are assessed on the effectiveness of the writing for the audience and purpose, ideas, structure and cohesion, as well as the mechanical aspects of writing, including grammar, punctuation, and spelling. The multiple-choice questions are based on a range of contexts including daily-life questions.

=== Section B: General knowledge and skills ===
Section B is a 1.5-hour General Knowledge and Skills test with 15 minutes of reading time (1 hour and 45 minutes in total), including

- 1 extended writing task – 30 minutes
- 50 multiple-choice questions – 60 minutes total
  - 25 mathematics, science and technology multiple-choice questions – 30 minutes
  - 25 arts and humanities multiple-choice questions – 30 minutes

Note: Time for each part are suggestions only. Students are free to spend more or less time on any other parts in Section B.

Section B is similar in format to those GATs prior to the reform in 2022. In the writing task of Section B, students develop a piece of writing presenting a point of view in response to several prompts. In addition to the information provided, students are accessed on their ability to draw on their own ideas to communicate clearly and effectively to the reader. The multiple-choice questions in Section B cover mathematics, science, technology, humanities, arts and social sciences. This section consists of groups of questions or units. Each unit offers one or more pieces of information, with several questions relating to that information.

== Scores ==
=== Section A only ===
Victorian Literacy and Numeracy Standards
Area	Classification	Percentage	Total percentage
Reading	Met	85.7%	96.4%
Reading	Met with excellence	10.7%	96.4%
Writing	Met	85.0%	96.3%
Writing	Met with excellence	11.3%	96.3%
Numeracy	Met	84.3%	96.4%
Numeracy	Met with excellence	12.1%	96.4%
Percentage of students in 2022 who met and met with excellence in the Victorian Literacy and Numeracy Standards

All senior secondary students enrolled in one or more VCE or scored VCE VET Unit 3/4 sequence are tested against the Victorian Literacy and Numeracy Standards when they sit the General Achievement Test. The standards are derived from Level 3 of the Australian Core Skills Framework (ACSF), which are required to engage with everyday life, work and further study beyond schooling. All students who completed part A of the General Achievement Test will receive a statement in three areas: Reading, writing and numeracy in their results if they have met the standards.

- If the standard is met, it will state that the student "has met the standard in year"
- If not met, it will state "has not yet met the standard in year"
- If a high score is achieved, it will state "has met the standard and achieved excellence in year"

=== Section A and Section B ===
The normal distribution graph of VCE study scores. Note: Students can only achieve a score no more than 50.

Students who completed both parts of the General Achievement Test will be issued a standardised score between 0 and 50 in addition to the statements above. The score is calculated in the same way as VCE study scores, which compare a student's performance in relation to all other students who undertook that study. Scores are given to three areas of interest: Writing and written communication, Reading and humanities/arts/social sciences, and Numeracy and mathematics/science/technology. If the student has been given EAL status, it is also noted on the Statement of Results.

Study scores are calculated according to a normal distribution, where the mean is 30 and the standard deviation is 7, with most study scores falling in the range 23 to 37, and a study score of 40 or more places a student in the top 9% of all students in that subject. This statement is also given in the bottom section with the following table:

Standardised Score	45	40	35	30	25	20
Proportion of students on or above this position (approximate)	2%	9%	26%	53%	78%	93%

== See also ==
- Victorian Certificate of Education
- Victorian Tertiary Admissions Centre
