= S6 =

S6 or S-6 may refer to:

== Routes ==
- S6 (Berlin), an S-Bahn line in Germany
- S6 (Milan suburban railway network) line in Italy
- S6 (Munich), an S-Bahn line in Germany
- S6 (Rhine-Main S-Bahn) line in Germany
- S6 (Rhine-Ruhr S-Bahn) line in Germany
- S6 (St. Gallen S-Bahn) line in the cantons of Glarus and St. Gallen, Switzerland
- S6 (ZVV), a Zurich S-Bahn line in the cantons of Aargau and Zurich in Switzerland
- S6, a cross-border line of Basel S-Bahn, Switzerland/Germany
- S6, a Hanover S-Bahn, line in Germany
- S6, a Karlsruhe Stadtbahn, line in Germany
- S6, a Lucerne S-Bahn, line in the cantons of Bern and Lucerne, Switzerland
- S6, a Rhein-Ruhr S-Bahn, line in Germany
- S6, a Rhine-Main S-Bahn, line in Germany
- S6, a Stuttgart S-Bahn, line in Germany
- S6, a Styria S-Bahn line in Austria
- S6, a cross-border line of Tyrol S-Bahn, Austria/Germany
- Line S6 (Beijing Subway), China
- Line S6 (Nanjing Metro), China
- Seehas, a regional railway between Konstanz and Engen, Germany
- Tongmi line in China
- County Route S6 (California)
- Expressway S6 (Poland)
- Essex, a county of England
- S6 postcode, covering areas of north western Sheffield

== Science ==
- Ribosomal protein s6
- S6: Keep under ... (inert gas to be specified by the manufacturer), a safety phrase in chemistry
- hexasulfur, a cyclic sulfur allotrope
- the symmetric group of degree six

== Technology ==
- Samsung Galaxy S6, a smartphone produced by Samsung
- Samsung Galaxy Tab S6, an Android tablet
- S6 NBC Respirator, the protective gas mask issued to the British armed forces from 1966 up until the introduction of the current-issue S10 in 1986
- S6 truss, a part of the International Space Station
- s6 (software), a software suite providing process supervision in Unix-like systems.

== Vehicles ==
- ALCO S-6, an American diesel switching (shunting) locomotive
- Audi S6, a car
- Prussian S 6, a 1906 steam locomotives class
- Union Pacific Class S-6, an American diesel switching (shunting) locomotive
- Rans S-6 Coyote II, a light aircraft
- Supermarine S.6 (1929), and Supermarine S.6B (1931), British racing seaplanes
- USS S-6 (SS-111), a 1919 S-class submarine of the United States Navy
- HMS Cachalot (S06), a 1957 British Porpoise-class submarine

== Other uses ==
- Staff (military), a communications officer within military units
- Star Air (Denmark), IATA airline designator
- S6 (classification), a paralympic swimming classification

== See also ==
- 6S (disambiguation)
