= Victorian Certificate of Education =

School qualification offered in Victoria, Australia

Victorian Certificate of Education examination
- A mock-up of an exam paper's front page
- Acronym: VCE
- Type: Paper-based Standardised Exam
- Administrator: Victorian Curriculum and Assessment Authority
- Skills tested: Varies depending on the subject, but in almost all VCE subjects general knowledge, fundamental writing, and numerical skills are tested.
- Purpose: Admission to undergraduate programs of universities and colleges
- Year started: 1987
- Duration: Various
- Score range: 0–50 study scores
- Offered: Biannually (Note: At the end of an Australian school year (October/November) and Northern Hemisphere Timetable (May))
- Restrictions on attempts: Same unit cannot count twice towards unit requirements
- Regions: Victoria, Australia (Note: also in selected schools in China, Malaysia, Philippines, Timor-Leste and Vietnam)
- Languages: English (Note: except LOTE language subjects, which are conducted in English and respective languages)
- Annual number of test takers: 90,780 (2022)
- Fee: Free for local students AU$75.2–465.0 for international students depending on units taken
- Used by: Universities, mainly through Victorian Tertiary Admissions Centre (VTAC)
- Website: www.vcaa.vic.edu.au/curriculum/vce/Pages/Index.aspx

The Victorian Certificate of Education (VCE) is the credential available to secondary school students who successfully complete year 10, 11 and 12 in the Australian state of Victoria as well as in some international schools in China, Malaysia, Philippines, Timor-Leste, and Vietnam.

Study for the VCE is usually completed over two years, but can be spread over a longer period in some cases.

The VCE was established as a pilot project in 1987. The earlier Higher School Certificate (HSC) was abolished in Victoria, Australia in 1992.

Delivery of the VCE Vocational Major, an "applied learning" program within the VCE, began in 2023.

== Structure ==
The Victorian Certificate of Education is generally taught in years 10, 11 and 12 of secondary education in Victoria; but some students are able to start their VCE studies in earlier year if the school or institution allows it.

All VCE studies are organised into units. VCE subjects typically consist of four units with each unit covering one semester of study. Each unit comprises a set number of outcomes (usually two or three); an outcome describes the knowledge and skills that a student should demonstrate by the time the student has completed the unit. Subject choice depends on each individual school. Units 3/4 of a subject must be studied in sequential order, whereas units 1/2 can be mixed and matched. Students are not required to complete all the units of a subject as part of the VCE course, meaning they are able to change subject choice between years 10, 11 and 12.

On completing a unit, a student receives either a 'satisfactory' (S) or 'non-satisfactory' (N) result. If a student does not intend to receive an Australian Tertiary Admission Rank (ATAR), a 'satisfactory' result is all that is required to graduate with the VCE.

To gain an ATAR a student must satisfactorily complete three units of any subject in the English field (at least one English field subject is compulsory) and twelve units in any other subjects.

=== Assessment ===
VCE studies are assessed both internally (in school) and externally (through the Victorian Curriculum and Assessment Authority (VCAA)). During units 1/2 all assessment is internal, while in units 3/4 assessment is conducted both internally and externally.

VCE Vocational Major units are only assessed internally.

==== Internal assessment ====
Internal assessment is conducted via "school assessed coursework" (SACs) and "school assessed tasks" (SATs).

"School assessed coursework" (SACs) are the primary avenue of internal assessment, with assessment in every VCE study consisting of at least one SAC. SACs are tasks that are written by the school and must be done primarily in class time; they can include essays, reports, tests, and case studies. Some studies in the visual arts and technology areas are also assessed via "school assessed tasks" (SATs). SATs are generally practical tasks that are examined in school. Both SACs and SATs are scaled by VCAA against external assessment; this is to eliminate any cheating or variances in task difficulty.

==== External assessment ====
External assessment is conducted in the form of examinations set by the Victorian Curriculum and Assessment Authority for units 3/4 studies. As of 2013, only the General Achievement Test (GAT) will be examined in June, with all subjects now only having one external assessment with the exceptions of mathematics subjects, LOTE studies, which consist of both a written and oral external test, performance studies, which consist of both a written external test and a performance, and Extended Investigations, which consist of an oral presentation and a Critical Thinking Test. All examinations except the Critical Thinking Test for Extended Investigation and the GAT are held in late October and most of November.

Subjects in the LOTE field (languages other than English) are also assessed in the form of oral examinations. Subjects in the Dance, Drama/Theatre Studies and Music fields, as well as Extended Investigations, are assessed by a performance for a VCAA panel of examiners as part of their external assessment. All performance-based external assessments (Oral Examinations and Music Performances) are typically held in early October.

==== General Achievement Test (GAT) ====
The GAT is an essential part of VCE external assessment. It provides the basis for a quality assurance check on the marking of examinations, and for deriving an indicative study score if the student misses the external assessment with a valid reason. All students who are enrolled in a VCE units 3/4 study are required to sit some or all of the GAT, including students completing the VCE Vocational Major.

=== Scoring ===
==== Study scores ====
The normal distribution graph of VCE study scores. Note: Students can achieve a study score of at least 50 in all subjects, however some subjects, such as Specialist Maths, have the potential to scale higher than a study score of 50.

Students will be eligible for a study score of between 0 and 50 if they have completed at least two Graded Assessments, and have satisfactorily completed both units 3/4 of a VCE study. Study scores are calculated by VCAA, and indicate a student's performance in relation to all other students who undertook that study.

Study scores are calculated by combining the standardised scores for each Graded Assessment with specific percentages, then ranked against all students in the subject according to a normal distribution, where the mean is 30 and the standard deviation is 7, with most study scores falling between 23 and 37. For studies with many enrolments (1000 or more), a study score of 40 or more places a student in the top 9% of all students in that subject.

If a student is ill or affected by other personal circumstances during an external assessment, and whose result is unlikely to be a fair or accurate demonstration of their learning or achievement, they may apply for a derived examination score (DES). Long-term illness or other ongoing conditions that have been present over the year are not eligible for a DES. Students will need to supply independent evidence to apply for a DES, and will be examined case by case by VCAA. The derived score is calculated statistically from the student's other assessments, including school-based assessments, GAT scores, other external assessment scores (if available) and grades provided by the school.

==== Scaling ====
Scaling is the process that adjusts VCE study scores into ATAR subject scores. The Victorian Tertiary Admissions Centre (VTAC) adjusts all VCE study scores to equalise results between studies with stronger cohorts, and those with weaker ones. Contrary to common perception, scaling is not based on the difficulty of the subject, as each study score is in fact a ranking. The score adjustment ensures that in those subjects where it is easier to overtake the cohort, the score is adjusted downward, while in subjects where it is difficult to score highly, it is moved upwards. This makes sure obtaining the average score in one study required the same level of achievement as every other study.

Mathematics subjects and language subjects have additional scaling rules. In mathematics subjects (General Mathematics, Mathematical Methods and Specialist Mathematics), all three studies are scaled against each other in addition to being scaled against all other studies, then the higher of the two scaling scores will then be used. This is due to mathematics having a distinct hierarchy of studies with varying difficulties, so students studying the harder subjects will not be disadvantaged by the level of difficulty. In LOTE (Languages Other Than English) subjects, study scores are adjusted by adding up to five to the initial scaled study score average. This adjustment is different for each subject and score, and decreases as the study score moves away from 30.

==== ATAR ====
ATAR in Victoria is calculated by the Victorian Tertiary Admissions Centre (VTAC) every year using student results provided by the Victorian Curriculum and Assessment Authority (VCAA). VTAC will combine the student's results into an "aggregate" which is a sum of selected (scaled) results from eligible subjects:

- the student's best score in one of English, English Language, Literature, or English as an Additional Language (EAL),
- the student's next three best scores; along with the English score form the "primary four" results,
- 10% of the next two best scores, known as "increments" (where available).

The aggregates, which can range from 0 to, theoretically, over 220, are then mapped to percentiles for conversion to an ATAR. Students must pass an English subject in order to qualify for an ATAR as well as the Victorian Certificate of Education (VCE). The primary four results must be taken from VCE or Vocational Education and Training (VET) Units 3 and 4 sequences, while the increments can also include other results, such as interstate study or university extension studies. There are also other rules, such as only two studies from the same subject area can contribute to the "primary 4". For example, if the student completed Unit 3/4 for all General Mathematics, Mathematical Methods, and Specialist Mathematics, the one with the lowest study score must be an increment, even if the score is higher than all other studies outside of mathematics.

The group of students with the highest aggregates will be assigned the highest ATAR of 99.95. ATARs below 30.00 are reported as "less than 30" on printed ATAR statements, however the actual ATAR is available online.

View source data.

==== Unscored VCE ====
It is possible for students to complete an unscored VCE. Under this option, students still have to pass their coursework to be awarded the VCE course, but do not sit final exams and are not given an ATAR. The number of students completing an unscored VCE has increased every year since 2015, with 8.3% of VCE students completing an unscored VCE in 2020.

=== Studies ===
VCE studies refer to the various subjects available to students to contribute to their successful completion of the qualification. There are currently 128 VCE studies, ranging from diverse fields such as the humanities, science, technology and mathematics. Studies are also permitted to study one or more VCE VET programs, vocational education-based subjects which contribute to the completion of the VCE, while also resulting in a nationally recognised VET qualification.

Although a student may choose to study any VCE subject in theory, this is dependent on availability of the specified study at the student's school. Certain schools do not offer certain studies, and as a result, students may pick alternate ones, or choose to study a particular subject through an external institution such as Virtual School Victoria (formerly Distance Education Centre Victoria).

To be awarded the VCE, a student must successfully complete at least:

- 3 units of an English subject, with two of those being units 3 and 4
- Three additional Unit 3/4 sequences
- Pass with a satisfactory of at least 16 units out of the normal 20–24 units

This therefore means that a student must study at least four subjects to be awarded the VCE. Selection of studies depends on other factors as well, such as prerequisites for university courses.

The following is a list of all VCE studies available:
† indicates that study is only available at 3/4 level, * indicates that study is only available at 1/2 level, ‡ indicates this VCE VET study is unscored and can not be included in the primary 4 subjects

| Area | Subjects |
|---|---|
| English (compulsory) | English; English as an Additional Language (EAL); English Language; Literature; Foundation English*; Bridging EAL* |
| Mathematics | Foundation Mathematics; General Mathematics; Mathematical Methods; Specialist Mathematics |
| Science | Biology; Chemistry; Physics; Psychology; Environmental Science |
| Humanities | Classical Studies; Geography History: Ancient History; Australian History†; Global Empires*; Revolutions†; Modern History*; Philosophy; Politics; Religion and Society; Sociology; Texts and Traditions |

| Area | Subjects |
|---|---|
| Performing Arts | Dance; Drama Music: Music Repertoire Performance; Music Contemporary Performance; Music Investigation†; Music Composition†; Theatre Studies |
| Visual Arts | Art Creative Practice; Art Making and Exhibiting; Media; Visual Communication Design |
| Business and Economics | Accounting; Business Management; Economics; Industry and Enterprise; Legal Studies |
| Design and Technologies | Agricultural and Horticultural Studies; Food Studies; Product Design and Technology; Systems Engineering |
| Digital technologies | Algorithmics (HESS)† Computing: Applied Computing*; Data Analytics†; Software Development† |
| Health and Physical Education | Health and Human Development; Outdoor and Environmental Studies; Physical Education |
| Cross-curriculum | Extended Investigation† |

LOTE Languages
| Arabic | Japanese First Language, Japanese Second Language |
| Armenian | Khmer |
| Auslan | Korean First Language, Korean Second Language |
| Bengali | Latin |
| Bosnian | Macedonian |
| Chin Hakha | Maltese |
| Chinese First Language, Chinese Second Language, Chinese Second Language Advanced, Chinese Language Culture and Society | Persian |
| Classical Greek | Polish |
| Classical Hebrew | Portuguese |
| Croatian | Punjabi |
| Dutch | Romanian |
| Filipino | Russian |
| French | Serbian |
| German | Sinhala |
| Greek | Spanish |
| Hebrew | Swedish |
| Hindi | Tamil |
| Hungarian | Turkish |
| Indigenous Languages of Victoria | Vietnamese First Language, Vietnamese Second Language |
| Indonesian First Language, Indonesian Second Language | Yiddish |
| Italian | |

VCE VET Programs
| Agriculture, Horticulture, Conservation and Land Management‡ | Equine Industry |
| Animal Studies‡ | Furnishing |
| Applied Fashion Design and Technology‡ | Hair and Beauty‡ |
| Applied Language‡ | Health |
| Automotive‡ | Hospitality |
| Building and Construction‡ | Information, Digital Media and Technology |
| Business | Integrated Technologies |
| Cisco‡ | Laboratory Skills |
| Civil Infrastructure‡ | Music Industry |
| Community Services | Plumbing‡ |
| Creative and Digital Media | Small Business‡ |
| Dance | Sport and Recreation |
| Engineering Studies | |

There are also University Extension studies available for high-achieving students. These subjects are carried out through multiple universities, including The University of Melbourne, Swinburne University and Deakin University. Monash University formerly offered extension subjects, but cancelled the program in 2019.

== Controversies ==
=== 2011 English exam ===
The 2011 English exam contained a column about tattoos attributed to "part-time journalist and blogger Helen Day", who wrote for the fictional "Street Beat" blog. The Age newspaper accused VCAA of plagiarism and breach of copyright as the column was very similar to an opinion piece featured in the newspaper's 23 September 2010 edition, written by Melbourne writer Helen Razer. The newspaper called the exam's column "clumsily edited".

=== 2012 History: Revolutions exam ===
In 2012, the History: Revolutions exam was meant to include a picture of Nikolai Kochergin's artwork Storming the Winter Palace on 25th October 1917, depicting the events of the 1917 October Revolution in Russia. Instead, a doctored picture was used in the exam, in which a large robot had been edited in to the background of the scene. (Said robot was a Marauder from BattleTech, a science fiction setting in which a fictional 28th century general named 'Aleksandr Kerensky' like the nonfictional October Revolution leader played an important role during a pivotal coup and civil war.) A VCAA spokesperson admitted that the image was "sourced and acknowledged by the VCAA as coming from the Internet", and new internal guidelines were issued for using internet-sourced content in exams. Of the 5,738 students that sat the exam, 2,379 chose the Russia section, of which 130 received an adjusted score.

=== 2016 Early Release of results ===
In 2016, a computer error allowed for 2075 students (approximately 2.5% of VCE candidates) to receive their ATAR score and VCE results five days earlier than they were supposed to be announced. External SMS provider for VCAA and the Victorian Tertiary Admissions Centre (VTAC), Salmat Digital, created an error that enabled students to receive their results before the expected release date by texting VCAA. Suzanne Connelly, a spokeswoman for VTAC and VCAA, apologised on behalf of all agencies involved.

This sparked outrage from parents of students who did not receive their scores, considering it as "unfair". Students who were able to receive their results also questioned its legitimacy and reliability. The VCAA and VTAC acted to contact affected students and their schools to reassure them regarding the accidental early results release. The release of the remaining 97.5% of results took place without further issue at the planned time. Education Minister James Merlino ordered an investigation into the situation, which had compromised results that are normally closely guarded until the official release.

=== 2018 English exam ===
The 2018 English exam included an article in which fictional writer Jonty Jenkins scathingly attacked a café franchise named "Calmer Coffee" opening in his local town, criticising its unfriendly staff and unwelcoming ambience that he described as "an assault on the senses". After the exam completed, students discovered that a real "Calmer Cafe" existed in Aberfeldie, a suburb just north-west of Melbourne. The café's manager, Elise Jenkins, shares the same surname as the exam question's fictional writer. Within hours, the café received over 100 negative reviews on Google Maps from Year 12 students, bringing down its rating from nearly 5 stars to as low as 3.3. Google Maps temporarily removed the café from search results, and later reinstated it but kept reviews inaccessible. At the time, the café had 405 reviews.

The next day, Tara Conron, owner of the cafe, told The Age she had hired a lawyer and would be pursuing legal action against VCAA for "uncanny" similarities between the exam and the actual cafe. Conron noted the identical surnames of Jenkins, stated that she employs someone with a "man bun", as does the employer in the exam article, and both the fictional and actual cafe "stand out" in their respective suburbs.

A year later, it was reported that Conron was no longer pursuing legal action against VCAA, telling The Age that the café staff had placed the matter behind them, and saying "we've just loved to joke about it this year".

=== 2022 Specialist Mathematics Exam 2 ===
On 11 November 2022 The Age newspaper published an article alleging errors on the 2022 Specialist Mathematics Exam 2 that included:

Section A Question 4: No correct answer (because the values of a and c can be any real number),

Section A Question 19: No correct answer (because confidence intervals are calculated for unknown population means, not for sample means),

Section B: Question 6 part (f) (the question cannot be answered because the relevant random variables are not stated to be independent).

The Examination Report published by the VCAA for this Exam makes no acknowledgement of these alleged errors. The answers used by the VCAA to mark this exam are not available to the public. It is reasonable to assume they are the same as the answers given in the Examination Report.

The alleged errors in this exam (as well as an alleged error in the marking scheme used for 2022 Specialist Mathematics Exam 1 Question 3 part (b)) form part of a public submission to the Parliamentary Inquiry into the state of education in Victoria (Parliamentary Inquiry submission 32). The Herald Sun has reported on this submission and it received further media coverage on Sky News Australia. A supplement (32.3) to the aforementioned submission to the Parliamentary Inquiry includes a detailed mathematical rebuttal of the VCAA's claims that the "questions did not present errors".

An open letter to the Victorian Education Minister signed by nearly 70 University mathematicians states that these questions "are unacceptably flawed. Each question exhibits some fundamental misunderstanding or misrepresentation of the underlying mathematics."

A report into the VCAA's VCE examination setting policies, processes and procedures (commissioned by the Education Minister Ben Carroll) by the former head of the NSW Education Standards Authority, Dr John Bennett, was handed to the Victorian government in March 2024 and made public on 23 March 2024. The Bennett Report substantiated the allegations of significant and serious errors in the 2022 Specialist Mathematics exams. This contradicted previous claims by the VCAA and an earlier review (commissioned by the VCAA) by Deloitte that there were no serious errors in these exams. The Department of Education has not yet released the review by Deloitte, which is currently the subject of several Freedom of Information requests and appeals of a decision to refuse access.

The Bennett Report makes 6 high-level recommendations, each with associated actions. One of the recommendations is that the VCAA work with mathematics and science academics when drafting and proofreading exams, to improve quality control before the tests end up on students' desks. Education Minister Ben Carroll has stated that all the recommendations of the Bennett Report will be accepted.

On 2 May 2024 the VCAA published amended copies of the Specialist Mathematics Examinations 1 and 2 and examination reports. Four questions containing serious mathematical errors (which the VCAA had previously denied existed on multiple occasions) were redacted. An amended copy of the 2022 Mathematical Methods Exam 2 and Examination Report was also published, with the redaction of a question containing a serious mathematical error.

The VCAA has made no official comment on the 'human cost' of these exam errors and whether teachers and academics who were ignored when they repeatedly alerted the VCAA of these errors should now receive an apology. The VCAA has not said what it has done to identify and compensate students who may have been disadvantaged (for example, by missing out on scholarships, Premier's Awards, or a higher University offer) by these errors and the incorrect grading of these exams as a result of the errors.

==== Allegations of other mathematical errors ====
The public submission (Parliamentary Inquiry) also alleges errors on many other VCE mathematics exams over a twenty year period, including:

1. 2016 Mathematical Methods Exam 2 Section B Question 3 part (h) where a function is incorrectly claimed to be a probability density function (pdf). An amended Examination Report (Note: 2016 VCE Mathematical Methods 2 examination report, Victorian Curriculum and Assessment Authority, accessed 27 May 2026) acknowledges that the function was not a pdf but does not admit an error and does not explain why, contrary to the instruction in the exam question, "Answers that were correct to the nearest integer were accepted".

2. Northern Hemisphere Timetable 2021 Mathematical Methods Exam 2 Section A Question 8, for which there is no correct answer. The original Examination Report (no longer publicly available) stated Option D as the correct answer. This answer is deleted in an amended Examination Report. (Note: 2021 VCE Mathematical Methods 2 external assessment report, Victorian Curriculum and Assessment Authority, accessed 27 May 2026) No answer is stated and no explanation is given for why no answer is stated. Question 4 from an official 2010 VCAA document (Mathematical Methods Sample Questions) contains the same error. It is reasonable to assume that this document is the source of the 2021 exam error. There is no evidence that the VCAA has ever alerted teachers to the error in this document.

Mathematician, educator and author Marty Ross has extensively documented and discussed many alleged VCE Mathematical Methods Exam errors and VCE Specialist Mathematics Exam errors.

=== 2022 Geography exam ===
On 8 September 2023 the Herald Sun newspaper published an article about colour blind students being given red-green scaled maps in the 2022 Geography Exam.

=== 2023 exam errors ===
==== 2023 General Mathematics Exam 2 ====
It was reported that "VCAA has launched an investigation after typographical errors appeared in Monday's second general maths exam. One error was picked up after printing, with students instructed to amend the paper. But the second error in a matrix-related question (Q9d) was not spotted until after the exam."

In an ABC Radio Melbourne interview between Rafael Epstein and an exam invigilator, it was claimed by the invigilator that the initial VCAA instruction for fixing the first error was unclear and potentially wrong.

It was reported in the Herald Sun that "A spokesman for the Department of Education admitted the two errors ... The VCAA will conduct further analysis to investigate how this error appeared in the exam, and will ensure that no student's score is unfairly impacted because of this mistake, and apologises for undue stress this has caused".

It was reported in the Herald Sun that the VCAA decided to "... award all students who attempted the exam a correct score for the [matrix-related] question" (Q9d) that contained the error.

==== 2023 Mathematical Methods Exam 2 ====
It was reported in the Herald Sun that the Mathematical Methods Exam 2 contained multiple errors and a question recycled from a previous exam. One of the errors was picked up after printing, with students instructed to amend the paper (replacing the letter "m" with the word "meters" in the phrase "m per second" that proceeded a mathematical formula). But the other errors (including missing words that left questions under-specified) were not spotted until after the exam. These errors (as well as many other errors from other 2023 VCAA mathematics exams) have been listed by teachers.

==== 2023 Specialist Mathematics Exam 2 ====
It was reported in the Herald Sun that the curves in the diagram for Section B Question 6 part (h) were not correctly labelled. This error was acknowledged by the VCAA which decided to "... award all students who attempted the exam a correct score" for that question.

This error, as well as errors on the 2022 Specialist Mathematics exams, were discussed in an ABC Radio Melbourne interview between Rafael Epstein and Monash University mathematician Professor Burkard Polster (8 November 2023). During this interview Professor Polster disclosed that he had offered to proof read the VCE mathematics exams for free but the VCAA had declined his offer. He also explained why giving every student 1 mark for this question is not actually fair.

==== 2023 Chemistry exam ====
It has been reported that the 2023 Chemistry exam contained an error. The "error was in a question about the composition of coconut oil, which had listed the formula for linolenic acid rather than linoleic acid, as intended."

==== 2023 Chinese Second Language Advanced (SLA) exam ====
The Australian Broadcasting Corporation (ABC) reported that two high schools gave Chinese language students the wrong exam paper. Some students who were meant to take the Chinese Second Language Advanced (SLA) exam were given the paper for the Chinese as a Second Language (SL) exam, which is at a significantly easier level and which was due to be held the following Wednesday. The ABC reported that "students affected have been asked to sign a confidentiality agreement to not share details of the exam before November 16. However, several insiders with knowledge of the exam have confirmed that at least one of the essay questions and details of some listening exercises have already been leaked online and are being circulated on Reddit and Chinese social media sites." Several affected students and parents were forced to decline commenting on the error because of the confidentiality agreement.

The VCAA's response to this mistake has been criticised by VCE Chinese teachers, who told the ABC that "it was the “basic responsibility” of the VCAA staff who were supervising the exam to check everything was correct. There are supposed to be “clear tags” to classify each exam paper. The fact that more than one school gave the wrong exam paper shows it's not an individual mistake, [it shows] the VCAA didn't provide adequate training for supervisors."

Sources to the ABC have said that "when one of the students flagged with a supervisor that they received the wrong paper, the supervisor told them it was "impossible" and to "continue with the exam"".

The education minister, Ben Carroll, subsequently confirmed that six students were incorrectly given the SL exam. He labelled it "a “traumatic” experience for those who were affected." He said that "the Victorian Curriculum and Assessment Authority [has] been asked to complete a full investigation into the incident." The Minister also said that academics had approached him about the VCE exams in general and that he has asked "the VCAA to partner with academic institutions in the writing, designing and vetting of exams."

==== 2023 Chinese as a Second Language (SL) exam ====
It was reported in the Herald Sun that students sitting the Chinese as a Second Language (SL) exam were instructed by supervisors to cross out a question, remove all subsequent references to it and to write on another topic. This paper had been accidentally given to some students in the previous week instead of the Chinese Second Language Advanced (SLA) paper.

The Australian Broadcasting Corporation (ABC) reported that some students also experienced problems with an audio component of the exam. Students were required to read a text prompt which was to be followed by an audio component. However, the audio component (required to answer several questions) failed to play for some students. This led to some students being unable to complete several questions worth 10 out of the exam's 75 marks. Furthermore, the text prompt associated with the missing audio was among the details that had been revealed on social media.

=== 2024 exam leaks ===
On 14 November, it was reported in the Herald Sun that the contents of a number of exams had been inadvertently leaked by the VCAA. Prior to 10 October, the cover pages made available on the VCAA's webpage contained hidden text that revealed the contents of affected exams. In many cases, the changes made between the leaked and the actual examination were considered trivial, with one teacher who spoke to the Australian Broadcasting Corporation (ABC) "flabbergasted that the CEO of VCAA could say that the questions were different"; at the heart of this controversy is that the VCAA was aware that examinations had been leaked, and yet had failed to properly rewrite examinations such that the leaked contents were sufficiently dissimilar so as not to advantage those who had seen the leaked contents over those who had not. On 17 November, when approached by the Sunday Herald Sun, VCAA stated they "sincerely [apologise] for these errors" and "are working to ensure every student is assessed fairly", although they have yet to issue an official apology.

As of 18 November, 56 exams are known to have been affected.

On 18 November, Kylie White, the then chief executive of the VCAA, resigned from her role, with Marcia Devlin, the chief executive of the Victorian Academy of Teaching and Leadership, taking over in the interim. Additionally, the VCAA released information surrounding how they will manage the 2024 examination leaks, having stated that they will be using an "anomalous grade check process", which was previously used during the COVID-19 pandemic in order to "ensure student results are fair and equitable"; this will be applied for all VCE examinations, except General Mathematics Examination 1 and the Music Composition and Music Inquiry externally assessed tasks.

=== 2026 site hack ===
In November 2026, the VCAA website was vandalized by a user of the name of 'DaggerElite', claiming to also have the 2026 exams as well. Shortly after the vandalism, the VCAA website went under maintenance. VCAA has released a statement that there is "No evidence VCE exam papers were accessed".

== Schools ==
The VCE is offered at all Victorian secondary schools. The VCE Vocational Major is a vocational and applied learning program within the VCE and is also offered at many government and non-government schools Victoria-wide.

Students who cannot complete a VCE course at their regular school for certain reasons (i.e timetable clashes, subject is not being offered in the students' regular school) are eligible to apply to Virtual School Victoria and complete up to two VCE units online.

Additionally, students interested in a LOTE are able to enrol in the Victorian School of Languages if they meet similar enrolment requirements to VSV.

== See also ==
- Victorian Tertiary Admissions Centre
- General Achievement Test
- Department of Education, Victoria
- Engage Education Foundation
- Equivalent National Tertiary Entrance Rank
- Education in Australia
- Senior Secondary Certificate of Education
- University admission
