= VCE Vocational Major =

Education Program in Victoria, Australia

The VCE Vocational Major (formerly Victorian Certificate of Applied Learning) is a version of the Victorian Certificate of Education (VCE) allowing students to pursue vocational training as part of their VCE. After completing a VCE Vocational Major a student will receive a VCE but will not receive an ATAR, unless they have completed a custom VM program that includes four scored VCE subjects.

The introduction of VCE Vocational Major in 2023 was part of a larger funding towards VET courses in general in order to allow students to complete subjects not available in a traditional VCE pathway and promote important industry including health, community services and early childhood education, building and construction, digital and media technologies, hospitality, and engineering.

== Commonalities with the VCE ==
All VCE and VCE-VM students are required to complete a minimum of sixteen units in total, eight of which must be Unit 3 & 4 sequences. Three of those units must come from the English group, including a Unit 3 & 4 sequence.

== Differences to the VCE ==
VM students have the option of completing VCE VM Literacy instead of another English Group study (English, Literature, English Language, and English as an Additional Language)

Besides the three Literacy or English units (most students will complete all four of Units 1 to 4), VM students must complete:

- two units of VCE VM Numeracy or of another Mathematics Group study (Foundation Mathematics, General Mathematics, Mathematical Methods, Specialist Mathematics
- two units of VCE VM Work-Related Skills
- two units of VCE VM Personal Development Skills
- two VET credits (180 hours) at Certificate II level or above.
- four other units (or five, if they only have three units of Literacy/English) to bring the total number of units to sixteen, eight of which must be Unit 3 & 4 sequences.

== Standard VCE VM Program ==
Most students completing a standard, full-time VCE VM would complete 20 units in total:

Year 10 & 11

- Unit 1 & 2 VCE VM Literacy
- Unit 1 & 2 VCE VM Numeracy
- Unit 1 & 2 VCE VM Personal Development Skills
- Unit 1 & 2 VCE VM Work Related Skills
- 2 Cert II or Cert III credits from the VET study of their choice, taken either at their high school or at an external VET provider such as another high school, a TAFE college, or an RTO.

Year 12

- Unit 3 & 4 VCE VM Literacy
- Unit 3 & 4 VCE VM Numeracy
- Unit 3 & 4 VCE VM Personal Development Skills
- Unit 3 & 4 VCE VM Work Related Skills
- 2 Cert II or Cert III credits from the VET study of their choice, taken either at their high school or at an external VET provider such as another high school, a TAFE college, or an RTO.

== Non-standard VCE VM Program ==
The VCE VM is a very flexible certificate, and so long as the base requirements are met, any other studies can also be included - within the scope of each school's own policies and capacity. For example, a student could complete the VCE VM and also receive an ATAR if they chose the following subjects:

Year 10 & 11

- Unit 1 & 2 English
- Unit 1 & 2 General Mathematics
- Unit 1 & 2 VCE VM Personal Development Skills
- Unit 1 & 2 Biology
- 2 Cert II or Cert III credits from a scored VET study of their choice, taken either at their high school or at an external VET provider such as another high school, a TAFE college, or an RTO.

Year 12

- Unit 3 & 4 English
- Unit 3 & 4 General Mathematics
- Unit 3 & 4 Biology
- Unit 3 & 4 VCE VM Work Related Skills
- 2 Cert II or Cert III credits from a scored VET study of their choice, taken either at their high school or at an external VET provider such as another high school, a TAFE college, or an RTO.
