= Ultranet (product) =

Defunct online learning system

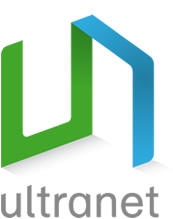
Ultranet logo

The Ultranet was an online learning management system developed for the Victorian Department of Education and Early Childhood Development in Australia to provide extensive services to students, parents and teachers in government schools. The Ultranet was built by Australian IT firm CSG and phased into school use between 2006 and 2010. Following an audit in 2012 that found that the Ultranet seriously lacked the features and functionality it was intended to deliver, the Victorian government announced that it would be abandoning support for the system at the end of 2013.

Ultranet was the subject of Operation Dunham, an investigation made by the Independent Broad-Based Anti-Corruption Commission into the development and rollout of Ultranet, including the role played by Glen Waverley Secondary College in oversdeeing itd formation and rollout. This operation found corruption in the tender process, and laid charges against three individuals. It also reported that the cost of Ultranet potentially reached $240 million, far more than the initial estimate of $60 million.

== Implementation ==
"The Ultranet" was originally piloted in 22 schools in 2006 under the label 'Student@Centre', and the system was rolled out to all Victorian government schools throughout 2010.

"Ultranet Coaches", who were teachers employed to assist in the implementation of the ultranet in DEECD schools, were notified in May 2011 that at the end of that year their positions would no longer exist. This decision sparked speculation that DEECD was planning to 'sell off' the Ultranet to other education systems, including the Catholic sector. In addition to online comments and leaks, this speculation was also supported by the existence of the position of Ultranet 'Business Owner'.

== Launch and reception ==
A pupil-free professional development day was planned for 9 August 2010 for teaching staff to learn how to use the Ultranet. However heavy server loads caused the system to crash around 9.00am and teaching was unable to continue. Some schools were reported to have abandoned the training day and staff dismissed early. Despite this failure, the next day, Ultranet held a promotional event at the Melbourne Convention and Exhibition Centre, at a cost of $1.4 million. The event featured singing and dance performances, as well as a bus decorated with Ultranet livery.

Further criticism was made about the Ultranet being an exclusively closed space. While the Ultranet was designed with online safety as a priority, the lack of modern Web 2.0 tools forced users to embed content from other sources, somewhat undermining the safety and privacy priority. At the time, many schools already had access to other free online learning management systems, including Moodle and Google Apps. Criticism was also made surrounding the lack of options in 'Learning Tasks', where many other rival Learning Management Systems had more modern and flexible solutions.

== 2012 Victorian government review of the Ultranet ==
In December 2012, the secretary of the Education Department, Richard Bolt, announced that the Victorian government was "looking at the Ultranet in its entirety... It's a fact, and a well-known fact I think, that the level of take-up of the Ultranet has been nothing like what was intended."

An audit by the Victorian auditor general's office found "the Ultranet was poorly planned and implemented. Six years after its announcement, it is yet to achieve expected benefits for students, parents and schools. It is significantly late, more than 80 per cent over its first announced budget, has very low uptake, and does not have originally intended functionality." The auditor general also found that the cost of Ultranet had reached more than $180 million.

This audit identified a number of serious probity, procurement and financial management issues surrounding the Ultranet project. DEECD’s tender process lacked rigour and was seriously flawed. There is little confidence in the financial management practices around the Ultranet project, and limited assurance that the selected outcome represented value for money.

== Government abandonment ==
In June 2013 the Napthine government announced that it had signed a $2.8 million contract with NEC to continue to support Ultranet until the end of December 2013, after which it would no longer be backed by the government. Schools would then have to pay NEC to use Ultranet, or find other ways to access equivalent functions. On 19 December 2013 Ultranet was officially taken offline. Some 15 schools which had signed up to use it were migrated to GenEd, NEC's cloud based Ultranet.

== IBAC investigation ==
In December 2015, the Independent Broad-Based Anti-Corruption Commission (IBAC) announced that an investigation and public hearings would take place with regards to the tendering process of Ultranet.

IBAC made a number of key findings:

- Senior figures in the Education Department had bought shares in the company that won the Ultranet tender.

== Aftermath ==
Criminal charges were made against three individuals by IBAC.

Darrel Fraser, then a deputy secretary of the Department of Education, was charged with obtaining property by deception, and misconduct in public office. In 2020, he was sentenced to 300 hours of community service.
