= Victorian Certificate of Applied Learning =

Secondary school certificate in Victoria, Australia

The Victorian Certificate of Applied Learning (VCAL) was a 'hands-on' program for students in Years 10, 11 and 12 that was available from 2002 to 2023. It has now been superseded by the VCE Vocational Major and the Victorian Pathways Certificate. The VCAL was an Applied Learning certificate awarded to secondary school students in the Australian State of Victoria who chose the VCAL as an alternative to the Victorian Certificate of Education for the practical work-related experience, as well as literacy and numeracy skills and the opportunity to build personal skills that are important for life and work that it offered.

Like the Victorian Certificate of Education (VCE), VCAL was an accredited senior secondary school qualification developed by the Victorian Curriculum and Assessment Authority (VCAA).

VCAL was delivered at three levels: Foundation, Intermediate and Senior.

VCAL is a practical education stream, where students may work in a trade or part-time job on some days of the week and supplement this by doing a set course at school.

In 2012, the Victorian Liberal/National Coalition, under the leadership of Ted Baillieu made large funding cuts (over $300m) to the TAFE public education system, a major deliverer of VCAL courses for the youth and mature aged students, and cut funding to Secondary school VCAL programs. This resulted in students being unable to access many courses and job losses for VCAL providers for secondary schools.

== Replacement ==
In November 2019, the Victorian Government commissioned a review into vocational and applied learning at school. The review was led by John Firth, a former head of the VCAA. The report that resulted from the review was published in November 2020, and included a finding that 'Victoria should move to an integrated senior secondary certificate, with vocational education embedded in the Victorian Certificate of Education (VCE).'

In response, the Victorian Government announced that the VCAL would be phased out, replaced by new programs with redeveloped curriculum building on VCAL's strengths. Education Minister James Merlino stated that a 'single VCE certificate would make it easier for students to get a range of skills, both academic and vocational.' Merlino also said the reform would be partly in response to the stigma that VCAL was solely for non-academic students.

New programs to replace VCAL began delivery in 2023. At the intermediate and senior levels, VCAL is being replaced by the VCE Vocational Major, a new program within the VCE. At the foundation level, VCAL has been replaced by the Victorian Pathways Certificate.

== See also ==
- Department of Education and Early Childhood Development (Victoria)
- Victorian Curriculum and Assessment Authority
