= Victorian Curriculum and Assessment Authority =

Statutory authority responsible for curriculum and assessment in Victoria, Australia

Agency overview
- Formed: 2001; 25 years ago
- Headquarters: Level 7, 2 Lonsdale Street, Melbourne, Victoria, Australia
- Employees: 236 (FTE ongoing as of June 2024); 5316 (Casual or sessional, non-VPS, VCAA employed 2023-24) (was 377 in 2018-19)
- Annual budget: $107.395 million (2023-24)
- Minister responsible: Gabrielle Williams, Minister for Education
- Agency executives: Andrew Smith, CEO; Tony Bates PSM, Chair
- Parent department: Department of Education and Training
- Website: vcaa.vic.edu.au

The Victorian Curriculum and Assessment Authority (VCAA) is a statutory authority of the Victoria State Government responsible for the provision of curriculum and assessment programs for students in Victoria, Australia. The VCAA is primarily accountable to the Victorian Minister for Education. It is also responsible to the Minister for Training and Skills and the Minister for Families and Children in relation to sections of Part 2.5 of the Education and Training Reform Act 2006.

== Responsibilities ==
The VCAA is responsible for the Victorian Early Learning and Development Framework (VELDF) and the Victorian Curriculum. The Victorian Curriculum F–10 sets out a single, coherent and comprehensive set of content descriptions and associated achievement standards to enable teachers to plan, monitor, assess and report on the learning achievement of every student. The Victorian Curriculum F–10 incorporates and reflects much of the Australian Curriculum F–10, but differs in some important respects, most notably the representation of the curriculum as a continuum of learning and the structural design. Victorian Government and Catholic schools are required to use the Victorian Curriculum F–10. Independent schools may use the Victorian Curriculum F–10 as a model and resource for the effective implementation of the Australian Curriculum.

At the senior secondary level, the VCAA provides curriculum and assessment for the Victorian Certificate of Education (VCE) and the Victorian Certificate of Applied Learning (VCAL).

=== Victorian Certificate of Education (VCE) ===
The Victorian Certificate of Education (often abbreviated VCE) is one credential available to secondary school students who successfully complete year 10, 11 and 12 in Victoria, it is the predominant choice for students wishing to pursue tertiary education. The VCAA conducts external assessments for units 3/4 studies which includes written examinations, oral examinations or performances based on the study. In addition, the VCAA also administers the General Achievement Test (GAT), taken by all Victorian students prior to completing their VCE.

The VCAA showcases student work through an annual festival of works created by VCE students in technology, design, multimedia and the cinematic, visual and performing arts. It also recognises student achievement through the VCE Leadership Awards, Plain English Speaking Awards, VCAL Achievement Awards and Margaret Schofield Memorial Scholarships.

==== International Delivery ====
The VCAA delivers the Victorian Certificate of Education internationally through its VCE Offshore Program, in which Victorian schools' partner with overseas schools to provide the qualification. The program has been implemented in several countries such as China, Indonesia, Japan, Malaysia, Singapore, Timor-Leste, Vietnam, Papua New Guinea, and Vanuatu. In 2015–16, more than 1400 students participated in VCAA assessment programs with 25 overseas providers and in 2015, 460 students completed the Victorian Certificate of Education (VCE) with offshore providers.

===== Northern Hemisphere Timetable (NHT) =====
The Northern Hemisphere timetable was used to accommodate students following the northern hemisphere academic calendar (Typically from September to July). It provided a separate examination cycle, generally held in May, rather than the usual October-November examination period. The final NHT examination cycle took place in 2026, and the timetable has been discontinued for 2027 and the foreseeable future due to a lack of participating students and demand.

=== Victorian Certificate of Applied Learning (VCAL) ===
The Victorian Certificate of Applied Learning (VCAL) was a 'hands-on' option for students in Years 10, 11 and 12 and was a credential awarded to secondary school students who successfully complete year 10, 11 and 12 in Victoria, it was delivered under the VCAA. Students were permitted work in a trade or part-time job on some days of the week and supplement this by doing a set course at school. In 2020, it was announced that the VCAL will be merged with VCE by 2023, before being wholly suspended in 2025. Education Minister James Merlino stated that a 'single VCE certificate would make it easier for students to get a range of skills, both academic and vocational.', with the suspension of VCAL also in response to the stigma that it is solely for non-academic students. Since 2023 VCAL has been superseded by the VCE Vocational Major (VCE VM), which aims to assist students in vocational pathways.

=== National Assessment Program – Literacy and Numeracy (NAPLAN) ===
The VCAA also administers the National Assessment Program – Literacy and Numeracy (NAPLAN) which provides an indication of the literacy and numeracy skills of students. Students in Victoria undertake the testing in Years 3, 5, 7 and 9.

== Extra-curricular Programs ==
=== Plain English Speaking Award ===
The VCAA administers the Plain English Speaking Award (PESA) annually. PESA is a public-speaking competition for students aged 15–18 years. It is designed to provide opportunities for students to build self-confidence and extend their skills in oral communication, speech writing and research.
