= Australian Curriculum =

Curriculum for schools in Australia

The Australian Curriculum is a national curriculum for all primary and secondary schools in Australia under progressive development, review, and implementation. The curriculum is developed and reviewed by the Australian Curriculum, Assessment and Reporting Authority, an independent statutory body. Since 2014 all states and territories in Australia have begun implementing aspects of the Foundation to Year 10 part of the curriculum.

Credentialing, and related assessment requirements and processes, remain the responsibility of states and territories.

The full Australian Curriculum can be accessed at its own website.

== Learning areas ==
The learning areas in the Australian Curriculum are as follows:

Learning area	Foundation to Year 2	Year 3 to Year 4	Year 5 to Year 8	Year 9 to Year 10	Year 11 to Year 12
Arts	X	X	X	X	
English	X	X	X	X	X
Health and Physical Education	X	X	X	X	
Civics and Citizenship		X	X	X	
Economics and Business			X	X	
Geography	X	X	X	X	X
History	X	X	X	X	X
Languages	X	X	X	X	
Mathematics	X	X	X	X	X
Science	X	X	X	X	X
Technologies	X	X	X	X	
Work Studies				X	

== History ==
A nationwide curriculum has been on the political agenda in Australia for several decades. In the late 1980s a significant push for a national curriculum in Australia was mounted by the Hawke federal government. Draft documentation was produced but failure to achieve agreement from the predominately coalition state governments led to the abandonment of this initiative in 1991.

In 2006, then-Prime Minister John Howard called for a "root and branch renewal" of Australian history teaching at school level, ostensibly in response to building criticism of Australian students' (and Australians more widely) perceived lack of awareness of historical events. The Howard government convened the Australian History Summit in August 2006 to commence the process of drafting a national History curriculum. The Summit recommended that Australian History be a compulsory part of the curriculum in all Australian schools in years 9 and 10. The Australian History External Reference Group was then commissioned by the government to develop a Guide to Teaching Australian History in Years 9 and 10. The Reference Group comprised Geoffrey Blainey, Gerard Henderson, Nicholas Brown and Elizabeth Ward, and was presented with a draft proposal prepared earlier by the historian Tony Taylor. The Guide was released to the public on 11 October 2007, but little was achieved toward its implementation following the Howard government's defeat at the federal election in November 2007.

In April 2008, the Rudd government established the independent National Curriculum Board. Taylor, who had written the original draft for the Howard government-appointed Australian History External Reference Group, told The Age that he expected that the Reference Group's Guide to Teaching Australian History would be discarded by the new Board. Taylor had expressed public disapproval of the changes made to his original draft, both by the Reference Group and, Taylor suspected, by Howard himself. Taylor was of the opinion that the Guide had sought to establish a curriculum that was "too close to a nationalist view of Australia's past", and hoped that the new Board would produce a curriculum that was more in line with what Taylor saw as Rudd's "regional and global world view". In September 2008, the Board appointed four academics to draft "framing documents" which would establish a broad direction for the National Curriculum in each of four subject areas: history (Stuart Macintyre), English (Peter Freebody), science (Denis Goodrum) and mathematics (Peter Sullivan). In May 2009 the Australian Curriculum, Assessment and Reporting Authority (ACARA), a statutory authority, was established to oversee the implementation of the planned nationwide curriculum initiative. In March 2010 a draft national curriculum was released.

== Implementation issues and criticism ==
The Australian Curriculum has experienced implementation issues due to reluctance or slowness by some States in changing state curricula. New South Wales in particular has delayed its roll out of the new curriculum.

In May 2010, Anna Patty, an education editor for the Sydney Morning Herald, criticised the Australian Curriculum on the basis that it "threatens to water down the content" for senior students, compared with the existing Higher School Certificate. Under the new curriculum, students would have to learn statistics in mathematics, while the Extension 1 and 2 topics would be replaced with an easier specialist maths course. Patty said that the English courses would focus more on language and literacy, and less on literature, and that the curriculum would disadvantage gifted students.

In September 2010, the NSW Board of Studies criticised the then-draft Australian Curriculum, saying that it was inferior to the NSW curriculum. Among other criticisms, the Board said that the draft K-10 curriculum lacked an overarching framework, was overcrowded with content, diminished the teaching of literature, and that the maths curriculum failed to cater to the full range of students.

In October 2010, Peter Brown, a mathematics lecturer of the University of New South Wales, criticised the Australian Curriculum for lack of flexibility within the Year 9-10 and the Year 11-12 syllabuses by the removal of extension maths courses. Brown also said that the National Curriculum would "dumb down" the year 12 curriculum then offered in NSW.

In October 2013, conservative economist Judith Sloan criticised the business and economics components of the Australian Curriculum in particular, and offered the general criticism that "[t]he real rationale for a national school curriculum relates to the pursuit of centralised control by the federal government and the scope to impose fashionable values dressed up as the pursuit of educational excellence".

In June 2021, following media reports that the proposed national curriculum was "preoccupied with the oppression, discrimination and struggles of Indigenous Australians", the Australian Senate approved a motion tabled by right-wing senator Pauline Hanson calling on the federal government to reject critical race theory, despite it not being included in the curriculum.

== See also ==
- Education in Australia
- Australian Certificate of Education
- Australian Curriculum, Assessment and Reporting Authority
