= List of medical schools in Australia =

Medical education in Australia is provided by the medical schools and faculties of various universities, accreditation for which is provided by the Australian Medical Council (AMC). The admission to undergraduate courses requires the University Clinical Aptitude Test (UCAT), and postgraduate medical courses require the Graduate Australian Medical School Admissions Test (GAMSAT) or Medical College Admission Test (MCAT). Most medical schools also require an interview, usually in a Multiple Mini Interview (MMI) or panel format. Domestic students (e.g. Australian citizens and PRs), instead of applying to each university, must apply to each respective State-level Tertiary Admission Centres (TAC) for admission to all the universities in each target state (6) or territory (2), this is applicable to all the domestic students including those applying within their state of residency, inter-state or overseas-based Australians.

== Current medical schools ==
State/territory	School	City	Est.	First Class	Current Degree(s)	Previous Degree(s)	Notes	Admissions Test
Australian Capital Territory	Australian National University School of Medicine and Psychology	Canberra	2004		MChD	MBBS	http://medicalschool.anu.edu.au	GAMSAT/MCAT, domestic applications via UAC
New South Wales	University of Sydney School of Medicine	Camperdown, Sydney	1883	1888	BA/MD, BSc/MD, MD	MBBS	http://sydney.edu.au/medicine/	GAMSAT/MCAT, domestic applications via UAC
New South Wales	University of New South Wales School of Clinical Medicine	Kensington, Sydney	1960	1967	BMed/MD	MBBS	http://med.unsw.edu.au/	UCAT, domestic applications via UAC
New South Wales	Western Sydney University School of Medicine	Campbelltown, Sydney	2007	2011	BClinSci/MD	MBBS	https://westernsydney.edu.au/medicine	UCAT, domestic applications via UAC
New South Wales	University of Wollongong Graduate School of Medicine	Wollongong	2006	2007	MD	MBBS	http://smah.uow.edu.au/medicine/index.html	GAMSAT/MCAT, domestic applications via UAC
New South Wales	University of Newcastle School of Medicine and Public Health / University of New England School of Rural Medicine	Newcastle; Armidale	1978; 2008	1982 (BMed at UoN); 2012 (BMed — Joint Medical Program at UoN & UNE)	BMedSc/MD	BMed	http://www.newcastle.edu.au/school/medprac-pop/ http://www.une.edu.au/about-une/academic-schools/school-of-rural-medicine	UCAT, domestic applications via UAC
New South Wales	University of Notre Dame School of Medicine, Sydney	Darlinghurst, Sydney	2008	2011	BBioMedSc/MD, BAdvBioMedSc (Hons)/MD, MD	MBBS	http://www.nd.edu.au/sydney/schools/medicine	GAMSAT/MCAT/UCAT, domestic applications via UAC
New South Wales	Macquarie University School of Medicine	Sydney	2018		MD	MBBS	https://www.mq.edu.au/about/about-the-university/faculties-and-departments/medicine-and-health-sciences/macquarie-md	GAMSAT/MCAT, domestic applications via UAC
New South Wales	Charles Sturt University School of Rural Medicine	Orange	2020		BClinSci/MD	?	https://study.csu.edu.au/courses/doctor-medicine	UCAT, domestic applications via UAC
Queensland	Bond University Faculty of Health Sciences and Medicine	Gold Coast	2005	2009	BMedSt/MD	MBBS	http://www.bond.edu.au/hsm/	Psychometric Test, domestic applications via QTAC.
Queensland	Central Queensland University College of Clinical Sciences	Bundaberg Rockhampton	2021		BMedSci (Pathway to Medicine)		This course provides provisional entry to the University of Queensland's MD program upon successful completion (i.e. maintaining at least a 5.0 GPA) in the BMedSci. https://www.cqu.edu.au/about-us/school-health-medical-applied-sciences/college-clinical-sciences	UCAT, domestic applications via QTAC.
Queensland	Griffith University School of Medicine and Dentistry	Southport, Gold Coast Birtinya, Sunshine Coast	2004	2008	BMedSci/MD, MD	MBBS	https://www.griffith.edu.au/griffith-health/school-medicine-dentistry	GAMSAT/MCAT/UCAT, domestic applications via QTAC.
Queensland	James Cook University College of Medicine and Dentistry	Cairns, Townsville	2000	2005	MBBS		https://www.jcu.edu.au/college-of-medicine-and-dentistry	domestic applications via QTAC.
Queensland	University of Queensland Medical School	Herston, Brisbane	1936		MD (provisional entry), MD	MBBS	https://medicine.uq.edu.au/	GAMSAT/MCAT/UCAT, domestic applications via QTAC.
Queensland	University of Southern Queensland School of Health and Medical Sciences	Toowoomba		2023	BBMP		This course provides provisional entry to the University of Queensland's MD program upon successful completion (i.e. maintaining at least a 5.0 GPA) in the BBSC. https://www.unisq.edu.au/about-unisq/schools/school-of-health-and-medical-sciences	UCAT, domestic applications via QTAC.
South Australia	University of Adelaide Medical School	Adelaide	1885		BMedSt/MD	MBBS	http://health.adelaide.edu.au/medicine/	UCAT, domestic applications via SATAC
South Australia / Northern Territory	Flinders University College of Medicine and Public Health / Charles Darwin University Faculty of Health (also called "NTMP Flinders Pathway")	Adelaide Casuarina, Darwin	1974		BClinSci/MD, MD	BMBS	http://www.flinders.edu.au/medicine/ https://www.cdu.edu.au/health/clinical-science	UCAT, domestic applications via SATAC
Northern Territory	Charles Darwin University Menzies School of Medicine (also called "CDU Menzies Medical Program")	Casuarina, Darwin	2026		BClinSci/MD (5 yr dual-degree)	Not-applicable	https://www.cdu.edu.au/health/cdu-menzies-medical-program	UCAT, domestic applications via SATAC
Tasmania	University of Tasmania School of Medicine	Hobart	1965		BMedSc/MD	MBBS	http://www.medicine.utas.edu.au/	UCAT/MCAT, domestic applications via University of Tasmania as it is sole University in Tasmania, hence applications are directly to the university.
Victoria	University of Melbourne Melbourne Medical School	Parkville, Melbourne	1862		MD (guaranteed entry), MD	BMedSc/MBBS	The guaranteed entry pathway is contingent on the student maintaining a 75 (or 70 if the student is a Chancellor's Scholar) Weighted Average Mark (WAM) throughout their undergraduate degree. In addition, applicants must satisfactorily pass 5 out of the 8 stations in the MMI before progressing into the MD.http://medicine.unimelb.edu.au/	GAMSAT/MCAT, domestic applications via VTAC.
Victoria	Monash University School of Medicine	Clayton, Melbourne	1958	1966	BMedSci/MD	MBBS (Hons)	http://www.med.monash.edu.au/	domestic applications via VTAC.
Victoria	Deakin University School of Medicine	Geelong	2008	2011	MD	BMBS	https://www.deakin.edu.au/course/doctor-medicine	GAMSAT/MCAT, domestic applications via VTAC.
Western Australia	University of Notre Dame School of Medicine, Fremantle	Fremantle	2005	2008	BBiomedSc/MD, BAdvBioMedSc (Hons)/MD, MD	MBBS	http://www.nd.edu.au/fremantle/schools/medicine/medfreo.shtml	GAMSAT/MCAT/UCAT, domestic applications via TISC.
Western Australia	University of Western Australia Medical School	Perth	1956		MD	MBBS	https://www.uwa.edu.au/schools/medicine	GAMSAT/MCAT/UCAT, domestic applications via TISC.
Western Australia	Curtin University Curtin Medical School	Bentley	2017		MBBS	—N/a	http://healthsciences.curtin.edu.au/schools-and-departments/curtin-medical-school/	UCAT/Casper, domestic applications via TISC.

== Proposed medical school ==
State/territory	School	City	Est.	First Class	Current Degree(s)	Previous Degree(s)	Notes	Admissions Test
Queensland	Queensland University of Technology School of Medicine	Brisbane	2024	2028	BMedSci/MD, MD		This course is a 5-year integrated vertical double degree comprising a Bachelor of Medical Sciences and a Doctor of Medicine. Undergraduate entry at year 1 or lateral graduate entry at year 3. QUT School of Medicine	UCAT
Queensland	University of the Sunshine Coast	Sunshine Coast	2030 or before				https://www.usc.edu.au/about/unisc-news/news-archive/2024/december/unisc-announces-plans-for-sunshine-coast-medical-program	
Victoria	Federation University Australia		2027				https://www.federation.edu.au/about/news/media-release/federation-university-and-newmed-to-launch-groundbreaking-medical-school/	

== Medical schools in other nations where Australian students are considered domestic students ==
=== New Zealand ===
Australian citizens are treated as domestic student in New Zealand and vice versa, i.e. pay subsidized much lower fee and pay subsidized much lower fee and entitled to student allowance or welfare payments and domestic scholarships.

New Zealand has 3 universities with medical education, but 6 'schools'/campuses of medicine. Only 3 applications are needed – 1 each to these universities. University of Auckland and University of Otago admission for those who passed high school, whereas University of Waikato is for those have a bachelor's degree in any discipline and wish to pursue medical education.

- A. Undergraduate entry pathway for those who passed high school: Both Auckland and Otago teach the initial three years of the course in Auckland and Dunedin respectively and both schools include 'rural immersion' programmes as an optional part of their clinical curricula. After these first three years, Otago students are assigned to complete their degree in either Dunedin, Christchurch, or Wellington; whereas Auckland students are assigned to adjacent hospitals and teaching schools on a short-term basis with some teaching remaining in Auckland. Prior to the opening of the University of Auckland Faculty of Medicine in 1968, Otago had had a branch faculty in Auckland.
  - 1. University of Auckland teaches medicine
  - 2. University of Otago Medical School (based in Dunedin)
- B. Graduate entry pathway to admission in basic medical doctor degree for those who already have a bachelor's degree in other discipline:
  - 3. University of Waikato's new medical school, the New Zealand Graduate School of Medicine (NZGSM) will begin its first student intake in 2028. Admission criteria: New graduate-entry medical school will not only admit those who already have an MBBS. Instead, the term "graduate-entry" means applicants must have a prior bachelor's degree in any field of study to be eligible to apply. Applicants need a completed bachelor's degree from a recognized university, likely with a minimum B-grade average or GPA threshold. You do not need a specific science degree or a prior medical degree (MBBS/MD) to apply. Graduates from humanities, arts, or any other discipline will be eligible. Applicants will need to achieve a passing grade in the Graduate Medical School Admissions Test (GAMSAT), which is a standardized test assessing a broad range of skills including science, social science, and written communication. An interview process is also part of the selection criteria to assess aptitude and commitment to primary and rural healthcare in New Zealand

== Medical education for Australians in other nations ==
=== Fiji ===
Fiji does not treat Australian citizens as domestic students. Australian citizens do not pay significantly less than other international students for medical school in Fiji. They are charged the full international/regional fee rate, which is the same as citizens from most other countries outside of the specific "Pacific Islands Forum Countries" (excluding Australia and New Zealand).

- Fee:
  - Fiji Citizens: Pay the lowest, most subsidized domestic fees.
  - Citizens of Pacific Islands Forum Countries (Except Australia & NZ): Pay an intermediate "regional" fee.
  - Citizens of Other Countries (includes Australia and New Zealand): Pay the highest international fee rate. Fee is around FJD 32,000 per year (AUD 20,000) which is much lower than the fee international students pay in Australia.
- Medical colleges in FIJI with 6-year Bachelor of Medicine and Bachelor of Surgery (MBBS)
  - Fiji National University (FNU) at Suva city
  - University of Fiji (UF) at Lautoka city

=== Other nations ===
Australians are treated as foreign students and pay non-subsidised fee as international student. Some countries like Germany or Norway offer free or nearly free tuition for all students, including Australian and other international students, although admission to their medical programs is extremely competitive and may require local language proficiency. Many Commonwealth of Independent States, Philippines, China, etc. have some of the lowest fee and cost of living in the world for the medical education. Graduates from all these nations' universities need to pass additional country-specific tests for each country to be able to practice in those countries, including Australia or other developed nations such as Singapore, USA, Canada, UK, etc.

== See also ==
- Australian Medical Students' Association
- List of medical schools
- Medical education in Australia
