= Australian Tertiary Admission Rank =

Grading system for university entry in Australia

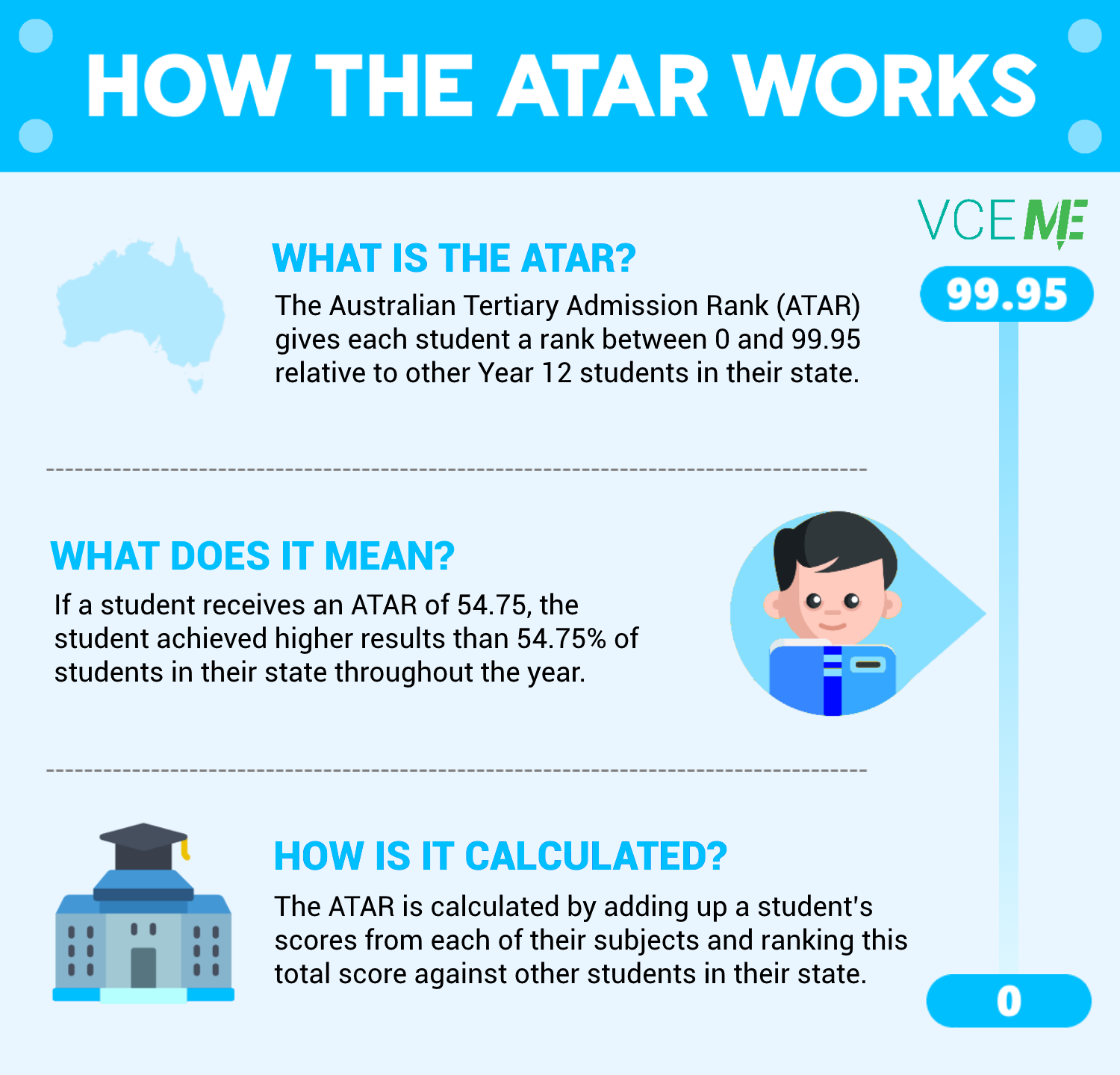
A brief description of how the ATAR works

The Australian Tertiary Admission Rank (ATAR) for all domestic students, or the ATAR-based Combined Rank (CR) for all International Baccalaureate (IB) students, are the primary criteria for determining the Selection Rank (SR) for admission into undergraduate courses in Australian public universities. Domestic Students are students who are Australian or New Zealand citizens, or Australian permanent residents, or the holder of long-term refugee visa. ATAR & CR are not applicable for international students as they must apply directly to each university separately and their SR is calculated by the university. The ATAR is calculated by each state or territory's own state-level Tertiary Admission Center (TAC) for all domestic students studying within their geographical limits. Interstate Domestic Students must apply to the TAC of their respective state. The Selection Rank is calculated by each University separately based on the ATAR or CR as well as additional points for each university's unique criteria such as a student's educational disadvantage or subject performance. ATAR is not a mark, but rather a percentile ranking between 0.00 and 99.95 which shows the student's relative position compared to all other students in the range of 16 to 20 years old who would have completed their respective year 12 exams in that state in a year.

The ATAR rank provides an indication of the overall position of the student in relation to the student body for that year across the state. A higher ATAR gives preference to that student for the course to which they wish to enrol in a university of their choice. The ATAR is used by all Australian public universities via their respective state-level Tertiary Admissions Centers, which are the unified admission center for all the universities within that state or territory. These bodies then allocate positions for the tertiary institutions in their relevant states. Private universities, with the exception of Bond University, do not primarily consider the ATAR and students must apply directly. The list of state-level TACs are as follows:

- Australian Capital Territory & New South Wales: Universities Admissions Centre (UAC).
- Northern Territory & South Australia: South Australian Tertiary Admissions Centre (SATAC).
- Queensland: Queensland Tertiary Admissions Centre (QTAC).
- Tasmania: University of Tasmania, Tasmania is an exception, where the University of Tasmania is the only tertiary institution and therefore acts as a self-governing admissions centre.
- Victoria: Victorian Tertiary Admissions Centre (VTAC).
- Western Australia: Tertiary Institutions Service Centre (TISC).

== History ==
=== Introduction of ATAR ===
In June 2009, the Federal Minister for Education Julia Gillard announced the removal of all state-level university entrance scores and the introduction of a national Australian Tertiary Admission Rank (ATAR) for Year 12 students of 2009 within the Australian Capital Territory and New South Wales, and for the rest of the country, excluding Queensland, in 2010. The ATAR was introduced to unify the university entrance system in Australia, where previously each state or territory had its own individual system (UAI in ACT/NSW, TER in SA/NT/WA/TAS, ENTER in Victoria). In 2020, Queensland switched to the ATAR as the primary tertiary entrance pathway, replacing the Overall Position (OP).

=== 2016 ATAR error ===
In 2016, a computer error allowed 2075 students to receive their ATAR score five days earlier than they were supposed to be announced. The external SMS provider for the VCAA, Salmat Digital, created an error that allowed students to receive their results by texting VCAA and requesting their scores to be sent to them on the expected release date. This sparked outrage from parents of students who did not receive their scores, citing that they considered it "unfair", as well as concern about some students receiving their results before they were equipped to deal with them (particularly with regards to counseling).

== Calculating the ATAR ==
In all states, the ATAR is a percentile given between 0.00 and 99.95 which compares a student's performance in senior secondary with that of their peers. For example, an ATAR of 99.00 would indicate that the recipient performed better than 99% of their peers. "Peers" is not the body of students receiving an ATAR that year, but a notional body of persons who might have qualified to receive an ATAR – as a result, the median ATAR score is generally above 50, depending on the state or territory. For example, the median ATAR score in NSW and the ACT for 2014 was 68.95. Since 2020, all jurisdictions have used a one-parameter cubic spline model to convert their aggregate scores into percentiles. In most states, when a student achieves an ATAR between 0.00 and 30.00, their notification will only indicate an ATAR of "30 or less".

Though there are differences in how each state calculates the ATAR, they are all primarily based on the student's scaled subject results. Scaling is a process that is performed by all states which align student results along a common axis such that the same score in two subjects equates with the same level of achievement. In this way, students are not disadvantaged by taking difficult subjects where the average achievement is lower. All states scale their subjects differently. Theoretically, this ensures that the ATARs between students are comparable even when they took a different combination of courses. Despite this, in a 2018 survey, 35.8% of HSC students said they chose one or more subjects because they believed it would help them achieve a higher ATAR.

=== Victoria ===
The Victorian ATAR (formerly ENTER) is calculated by the Victorian Tertiary Admissions Centre (VTAC) using student results provided by the Victorian Curriculum and Assessment Authority (VCAA). VTAC will combine the student's results into an "aggregate" which is a sum of selected (scaled) results from eligible subjects:

- the student's best score in one of English, English Language, Literature, or English as an Additional Language (EAL),
- the student's next three best scores; along with the English score these form the "primary four" results,
- 10% of the next two best scores, known as "increments".

The Victorian aggregates, which can range from 0 to over 210 (in exceptional cases), are then mapped to percentiles for conversion to an ATAR. Students must pass an English subject in order to qualify for an ATAR as well as the Victorian Certificate of Education (VCE). The primary four results must be taken from VCE or Vocational Education and Training (VET) Units 3 and 4 sequences, while the increments can also include other results, such as interstate study or university extension studies. There are also other rules, such as only two studies from the same subject area can contribute to the "primary 4". For example, if the student completed Unit 3/4 for all General Mathematics, Mathematical Methods, and Specialist Mathematics, the one with the lowest study score must be an increment, even if the score is higher than all other studies outside of mathematics.

The group of students with the highest aggregates will be assigned the highest ATAR of 99.95. ATARs below 30.00 are reported as "less than 30" on printed ATAR statements, however the actual ATAR is available online.

=== New South Wales ===
The shift to ATAR means that the ranks of most students receiving a UAI would increase by a small amount (although this would not present as any advantage as cutoffs would subsequently increase), while the maximum rank in NSW/ACT would change from a UAI of 100 to an ATAR of 99.95.

The New South Wales ATAR is calculated by the University Admission Centre (UAC) using student results achieved in the Higher School Certificate (HSC). The marks included in the calculation can be accumulated over five years. Subjects are scaled such that "the scaled mean in a course is equal to the average academic achievement of the course candidature where, for individual students, the measure of academic achievement is taken as the average scaled mark in all courses completed".

Prior to 2000, language courses were not influenced by the candidature's achievement in other courses, but scaled separately against achievement in French and German. Since the unification of languages scaling into the general pool of courses, scaling has been observed to favour courses taken by candidates from higher socioeconomic backgrounds — for similar levels of proficiency, French courses have enjoyed more favourable scaling compared to Arabic. According to Dr Ken Cruickshank from the University of Sydney, "The ATAR creates a hierarchy of languages and replicates SES differences rather than differences in language proficiency".

The aggregate is a sum of scaled marks in 10 units of eligible courses:

- 2 units of English
- 6 units from Category A subjects
- 2 units from Category A or B subjects (if English Studies was used for the English marks, then these must be Category A units).

Students achieve the highest possible aggregate given their results. The aggregates are mapped to percentiles and given to students on their ATAR Advice Notice.

=== Australian Capital Territory ===
The Australian Capital Territory (ACT) ATAR is calculated alongside the NSW equivalent by the University Admissions Centre (UAC). Results are calculated on the basis of students' achievement in the ACT Senior Secondary Certificate (ACT SSC). UAC treats all ACT and NSW students as one cohort and thus the two regions' ATARs are exactly equivalent. The aggregate score is calculated as a sum of the student's three best scores from major courses and 60% of the next best course (which may be a major or a minor course).

=== Queensland ===
Queensland transitioned from the Overall Position (OP) to ATAR in 2019, with the 2020 cohort being the first to graduate through the ATAR system. When the OP was still in place, the Queensland Tertiary Admissions Centre (QTAC) used a scaling method known as the "Queensland Core Skills Test". Since the introduction of the ATAR, Queensland now uses inter-scaling methods used by other states. ATAR can be calculated from any of the following combinations of results:

- 5 general subjects at Units 3 and 4,
- 4 general subjects and 1 applied subject, both at Units 3 and 4,
- 4 general subjects at Units 3 and 4, and 1 Vocational Education and Training (VET) qualification (Certificate III or higher).

Like in New South Wales, students will be awarded on the basis of the combination ensuring the maximum final percentile. Students must pass an English subject in order to receive their Queensland Certificate of Education (QCE) and thus qualify for an ATAR, but their English result does not necessarily need to be included in the calculation of their ATAR.

=== Tasmania ===
Since Tasmania has only one university, the University of Tasmania (UTAS), there is no state-wide admissions body. Students' results from the Office of Tasmanian Assessments, Standards and Certification (TASC) are provided directly to the university for calculation of scaling and ATARs. UTAS uses a polytomous Rasch model to scale course results. Students who qualify for the Tasmanian Certificate of Education (TCE) are automatically awarded an ATAR if they also pass four or more courses at the pre-tertiary level (Level 3 or 4). Unlike in other states and territories, students do not need to complete an English course to qualify for a TCE or ATAR, though they must demonstrate an adult level of reading, writing and communication through another subject or through a safety net test. Most students who qualify for an ATAR will have completed an English course anyway, since pre-tertiary English is required for the majority of university entry.

The Tasmania ATAR is calculated from a Tertiary Entrance Score (TES), which is the sum of a student's scaled results in their five best pre-tertiary subjects. Three of these subjects must come from the student's final year of study (Year 12 or 13), and students may only count scores from two years of their study, even if they have taken a Year 13. Other subjects, such as selected University Connections Program (UCP) and High Achiever Program (HAP) units, may also contribute to a student's ATAR. Since UCP and HAP units are only one semester long, only 8/15 of the scaled score may be counted towards the ATAR. The other 7/15 may come from any other subject but is generally chosen from the alternative semester UCP/HAP unit.

=== South Australia and the Northern Territory ===
The South Australian Tertiary Admissions Centre (SATAC) is the body responsible for scaling, calculation of an ATAR, and the admissions process of the participating institutions in South Australia and the Northern Territory. An ATAR can only be received by eligible students (i.e. the student has successfully completed the 200 credits requirement which includes passing Exploring Identities and Futures in Stage 1, Activating Identities and Futures in Stage 2, a literacy subject totalling 20 credits, and a numeracy subject totalling 10 credits) who have completed the South Australian Certificate of Education (SACE), for South Australian Students, or the Northern Territory Certificate of Education and Training (NTCET), for Northern Territory students. The SACE Board of SA is the educational body responsible for determining the overall grade a student receives in a Tertiary Admissions Subject (TAS), usually only Stage 2 subjects.

The university aggregate is a score out of 90.00 which is calculated from your TAS or other recognised learning and used to convert into an ATAR. SATAC considers the scaled scores (out of 20.0 or 10.0) of the best 90 credits of study. Of the 90 credits, 60 credits must come from TAS studied at Stage 2 (or a valid pair of 10 credit subjects). The remaining 30 credits of study has flexibility and can come from other TAS (equivalent to one 20 credit subject and half the next 20 credit subject) or recognised learning (e.g. Vocational Education and Training (VET)). Once the aggregate has been calculated, SATAC begins the process of assigning an ATAR to a university aggregate.

=== Western Australia ===
The Tertiary Institutions Service Centre (TISC) is responsible for the calculation of students' ATARs in Western Australia. TISC requires that students complete an English subject, though they must first demonstrate literary competency through their Year 9 NAPLAN results or an Online Literacy and Numeracy Assessment (OLNA). TISC derives an ATAR percentile from a student's Tertiary Entrance Aggregate (TEA), which is calculated as a sum of the student's best four scaled subjects out of their Year 12 ATAR subjects over up to five consecutive years. Students may additionally count 10% of their score in any of the following subjects:

- any Language other than English (LOTE),
- Mathematics Methods,
- Mathematics Specialist.

The maximum TEA is 430. Mature age students may also receive a Mature Age Tertiary Entrance Aggregate, which only incorporates a student's best two subjects as well as 10% of any of the above subjects. The TEA is converted to an ATAR percentile using the cubic spline model.

==== ATAR Bonuses Removal ====
The ATAR Specialist, Method, and LoTE bonuses are scheduled to be removed no earlier than 2027.

===== Critical reception =====
This move had mixed reception with WACSSO (Western Australia Council of State School Organizations) agreeing with TISC's decision, citing equality of opportunity.

Tony Buti, the West Australian minister for education at the time publicly urged TISC to rethink its decision.

== See also ==
- Austudy Payment (for those above 25 years old)
- Youth Allowance (for below 25 years old)
- List of universities in Australia
- Universities Admissions Centre (UAC) in NSW and ACT
- Victorian Tertiary Admissions Centre (VTAC) in VIC
- South Australian Tertiary Admissions Centre (SATAC) in SA and NT
- Tertiary Institutions Service Centre (TISC) in WA
- Queensland Tertiary Admissions Centre (QTAC) in QLD
