= NTCE =

NTCE may refer to:

- National Council for Teacher Education, a statutory body of the Indian Government that governs teacher education
- Nissan Technical Center Europe, research and development sites for Nissan vehicles
- Northern Territory Certificate of Education, former name of the Northern Territory Certificate of Education and Training, the high school credential in the Northern Territory of Australia
