= What Degree? Which University? =

What Degree? Which University? is a student-run university website that profiles the major Australian tertiary education institutions and their degree programs with advice on the university experience.

== Categories ==
The What Degree? and Which Uni? sections of the website provide information on Australian universities and their degree programs, along with profiles of current and former students who are currently or have formerly been enrolled in degree programs at particular institutions.

The website also provides articles and information on student life, student housing, and graduate opportunities for university leavers through the Lifestyle, Student Housing, Survival Guide and After Uni sections.

== History ==
The creator of What Degree? Which University? is David Handley, the founding director of international sculpture exhibition, Sculpture by the Sea. Handley first conceptualised What Degree? Which University? whilst studying his final year of Law at the University of Sydney.

In 1988, What Degree? Which University? took form through university seminars held at the University of Sydney, allowing prospective students to compare degree options by hearing current and former students of undergraduate degree programs discuss their studying experiences.

Handley resurrected the concept in 2010 with the help of a team of undergraduate students, and launched What Degree? Which University? as a website in August 2011. Six months after its launch, What Degree? Which University? had attracted more than 22,000 visitors and expanded to provide information about universities across Australia.

== Present ==
Today, the website covers 23 Australian universities and is staffed by 17 undergraduate and postgraduate students. What Degree? Which University? claims to have had 77,500 visits to the website (55,000 of which being unique visitors) and 450,000 page visits.
