= South Australian Certificate of Education =

School qualification in South Australia

The South Australian Certificate of Education (SACE) is awarded to students who have successfully completed their senior secondary schooling in the state of South Australia.

The SACE Board of South Australia (formerly known as the Senior Secondary Assessment Board of South Australia, or SSABSA) administrates the certificate. The SACE Board of South Australia is an independent statutory authority of the South Australian Government accredited under ISO 9001:2008.

The SACE curriculum is also taught in Northern Territory secondary schools, where it is known as the Northern Territory Certificate of Education and Training (NTCET). The South Australian Matriculation (SAM) certificate is a qualification based on the SACE curriculum which is administered by the SACE Board of South Australia and taught in some schools in Malaysia and China.

To receive the SACE, students must gain 200 credits from a range of subjects, usually over two years. Twenty credits is equal to a full year subject, while 10 credits is equal to a semester long subject. There are two stages: Stage 1, which most students do in Year 11, and Stage 2, which most students do in Year 12.

Students may attain a partial SACE certification by gaining the minimum number of credits, yet bypassing the ATAR system. This approach does not guarantee an entry to university, however, a student may gain admittance via alternative pathways such as first attending TAFE then transferring to university, or by sitting an entry exam.

== Importance ==
Completion of the SACE is a general requirement to get into universities and colleges of technical and further education (TAFE colleges) in South Australia, nationally and internationally. The certificate also provides many study options for students who want to follow a different pathway into the workforce, such as undertaking apprenticeships while still at school. The SACE's Research Project has been suggested to be non compulsory in 2012 by Australian Education Union SA branch president Correna Haythorpe.

== How the SACE works ==
There are two stages of the SACE:

- Stage 1, which most students do in Year 11, apart from the Personal Learning Plan subject (now gradually being replaced by Exploring Identities and Futures; a culmination of work to revitalise the Personal Learning Plan), which most students do in Year 10
- Stage 2, which most students do in Year 12.

Each subject or course successfully completed earns ‘credits’ towards the SACE, with a minimum of 200 credits required for students to gain the certificate.

Students will receive a final grade from A to E for each Stage 1 subject and A+ to E− for Stage 2 subjects. For compulsory requirements, to gain their SACE they will need to achieve:

- a C grade or better at Stage 1
- a C− grade or better at Stage 2.

The compulsory requirements are:

- Personal Learning Plan (or as of recently, Exploring Identities and Futures) (10 credits at Stage 1)
- Literacy – at least 20 credits from a range of English subjects or courses (Stage 1 or Stage 2)
- Numeracy – at least 10 credits from a range of mathematics subjects or courses (Stage 1 or Stage 2)
- Activating Identities and Futures (formerly Research Project) – an in-depth major project (10 credits at Stage 2). However, this is not compulsory for the NTCET.
- Other Stage 2 subjects totalling at least 60 credits.

The remaining 90 credits can be gained through additional Stage 1 or Stage 2 subjects or Board-recognised courses (such as VET or community learning) of a student’s choice.

=== Assessment ===
SACE studies are assessed both internally (in school) and externally. All stage 2 subjects have a 30% external assessment, which may be an exam, investigation or performance. As well as the compulsory subjects, stage 2 school based assessments are centrally moderated to ensure fair and accurate results.

== SACE and tertiary studies ==
SACE results are scaled and then used to calculate a University Aggregate, which is out of 90. This is then converted into an Australian Tertiary Admission Rank (ATAR), previously a Tertiary Entrance Rank (TER) which universities within Australia use to select students who will be offered places in particular courses. A TAFE SA selection score is also calculated for entry into other further education courses. Full details of South Australian university and TAFE entry requirements for 2012 onwards are provided in ‘Australian Tertiary Admissions Booklet 2013, 2014, 2015’, published by the South Australian Tertiary Admissions Centre, the South Australian Government authority which processes applications for tertiary courses in South Australia and the Northern Territory.

== Awards ==
SACE results are announced in December each year. Governor of South Australia Commendations are awarded to people who have "met the relevant criteria [of the specific award], achieved excellence in accredited SACE subjects and demonstrated the development of one or more SACE capabilities". Merits are awarded to students who receive an A+, and have displayed "exceptional achievement" (less than 2% of students taking a subject) in individual subjects in their Stage 2 SACE results. Prizes are awarded to the top student in certain subjects, including:

- Music (Don Maynard Music Prize)
- Physics (The Australian Institute of Physics Bronze Bragg Medal)
- Chemistry (The Way College Prize and Medal for Chemistry)
- Biology (The Hardwicke College Prize for Biology) and
- English Literary Studies (The Tennyson Medal)

== Current usage ==
A number of countries utilise the SACE (known as SACE International outside of Australia) as one of the pre-university qualifications.

=== Malaysia ===
SACE International (SACEi) offered in Malaysia is effectively an almost similar programme as Australian Matriculation (AUSMAT) program. The difference being their examination board and course structure. AUSMAT is administered by the School Curriculum and Standards Authority (SCSA) while SACEi is administered by the SACE Board. As for the course structure, AUSMAT consists of 50% coursework and 50% examination, while SACE International consists of 70% coursework and 30% examination.As well, the AUSMAT program only runs for one year (delivering only the Year 12 curriculum), whilst SACEi runs for two; however, the SCSA does offer the Western Australian Certificate of Education to its international schools, which runs for two years.

Some of the private universities offering SACEi in Malaysia include:

- DISTED College
- INTEC Education College
- Taylor's College
- UCSI College

== See also ==
- Australian Qualifications Framework
- University admission
- Education in Australia
- South Australian Tertiary Admissions Centre
