= Australian Catholic University =

Public Catholic university in Australia

Coordinates: 27.378°S 153.089°E

- Emblem
- Former names: List: Mount Saint Mary College (1908–1982); Catholic Teachers' College (1971–1982); Catholic College of Education (1982–1990)
- Motto: Truth in love
- Type: Public Roman Catholic research university
- Established: 1908 (antecedent); 1991 (as university)
- Religious affiliation: Roman Catholic
- Academic affiliations: ICUSTA; IFCU; ACCU; OUA; UA
- Budget: A$491.81 million (2023)
- Chancellor: Martin Daubney
- Vice-Chancellor: Zlatko Skrbis
- Provost: Julie Cogin
- Academic staff: 1,207.8 (FTE, 2023)
- Administrative staff: 1,296 (FTE, 2023)
- Total staff: 2,503.8 (FTE, 2023)
- Students: 32,283 (2023)
- Undergraduates: 25,037 (2023)
- Postgraduates: 5,841 coursework (2023); 290 research (2023)
- Other students: 1,115 (2023)
- Location: Brisbane, Canberra, Melbourne, North Sydney, Blacktown, Ballarat, Strathfield and Rome
- Campus: Urban and regional with multiple sites
- Colours: Red Purple
- Sporting affiliations: UniSport; EAEN; UBL
- Mascot: Varies by campus
- Website: acu.edu.au

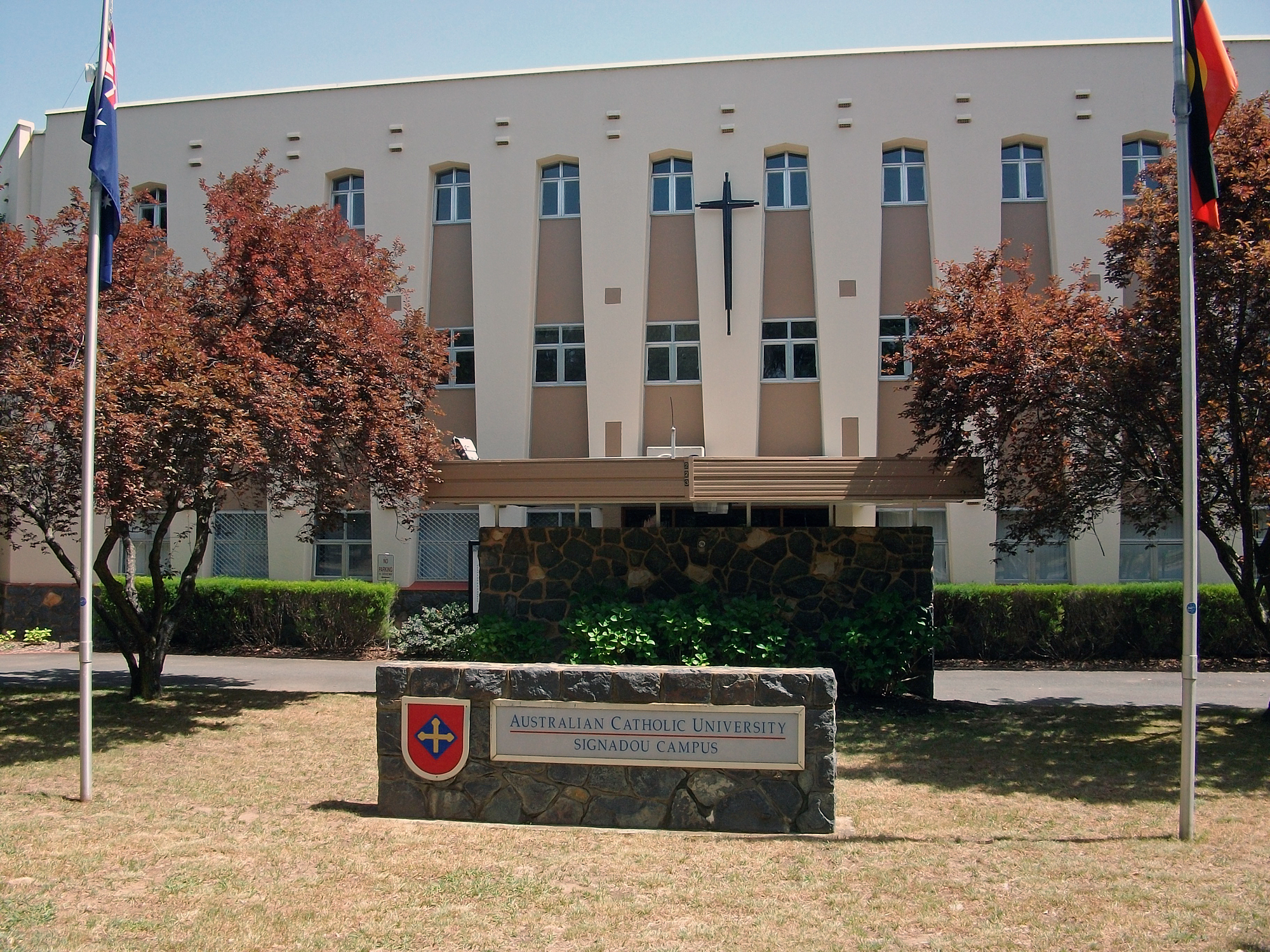
Australian Catholic University Signadou Campus in the Canberra suburb of Watson

Australian Catholic University (ACU) is a Commonwealth-funded higher education provider constituted as a public company limited by guarantee in Australia. It has seven Australian campuses and also maintains a campus in Rome.

== History ==
Australian Catholic University was opened on 1 January 1991 following the amalgamation of four Catholic tertiary institutions in eastern Australia:

- Catholic College of Education Sydney, New South Wales
- Institute of Catholic Education, Victoria
- McAuley College, Queensland
- Signadou College of Education, Australian Capital Territory

These institutions had their origins in the mid-1800s, when religious orders and institutes became involved in preparing teachers for Catholic schools and, later, nurses for Catholic hospitals. Through a series of amalgamations, relocations, transfers of responsibilities and diocesan initiatives, more than 20 historical entities have contributed to the creation of the university.

In March 2023, after librarians were ordered to remove rainbow flags displayed across campuses, staff and students wrote an open letter to the university's Vice-Chancellor Zlatko Skrbis claiming that his acts were "a direct affront to ACU's mission to act in truth and love in the pursuit of knowledge, the dignity of the human person, and the common good". In July 2023, ACU launched an internal investigation into its contracts with Asset Group Solutions. AGS provided security and cleaning services to ACU, but its founder was charged with corruption. Chief Operating Officer and Deputy-Vice Chancellor had been warned in 2018 about AGS's conduct but did not act on those warnings. ACU denyed knowledge of AGS's criminal activities and has launched an internal investigation.

In September 2023, as part of spending cuts, ACU announced plans to cut 113 full-time jobs, most of which were at the Melbourne campus. In January 2024, after it was discovered that Kate Galloway AM supported abortion legalization, she was paid A$1.1 million to leave her position.

== Governance and structure ==
ACU's vice-chancellor and president, Zlatko Skrbis, is responsible for representing the university both nationally and internationally and for providing strategic leadership and management. He holds a PhD in Sociology.

Deputy vice-chancellors have delegated responsibility for assigned areas of policy. These areas are academic, administration and resources, and research.

=== Faculties and departments ===
Each faculty is headed by an executive dean and supported by a number of associate deans and heads of schools.

== Campuses and buildings ==
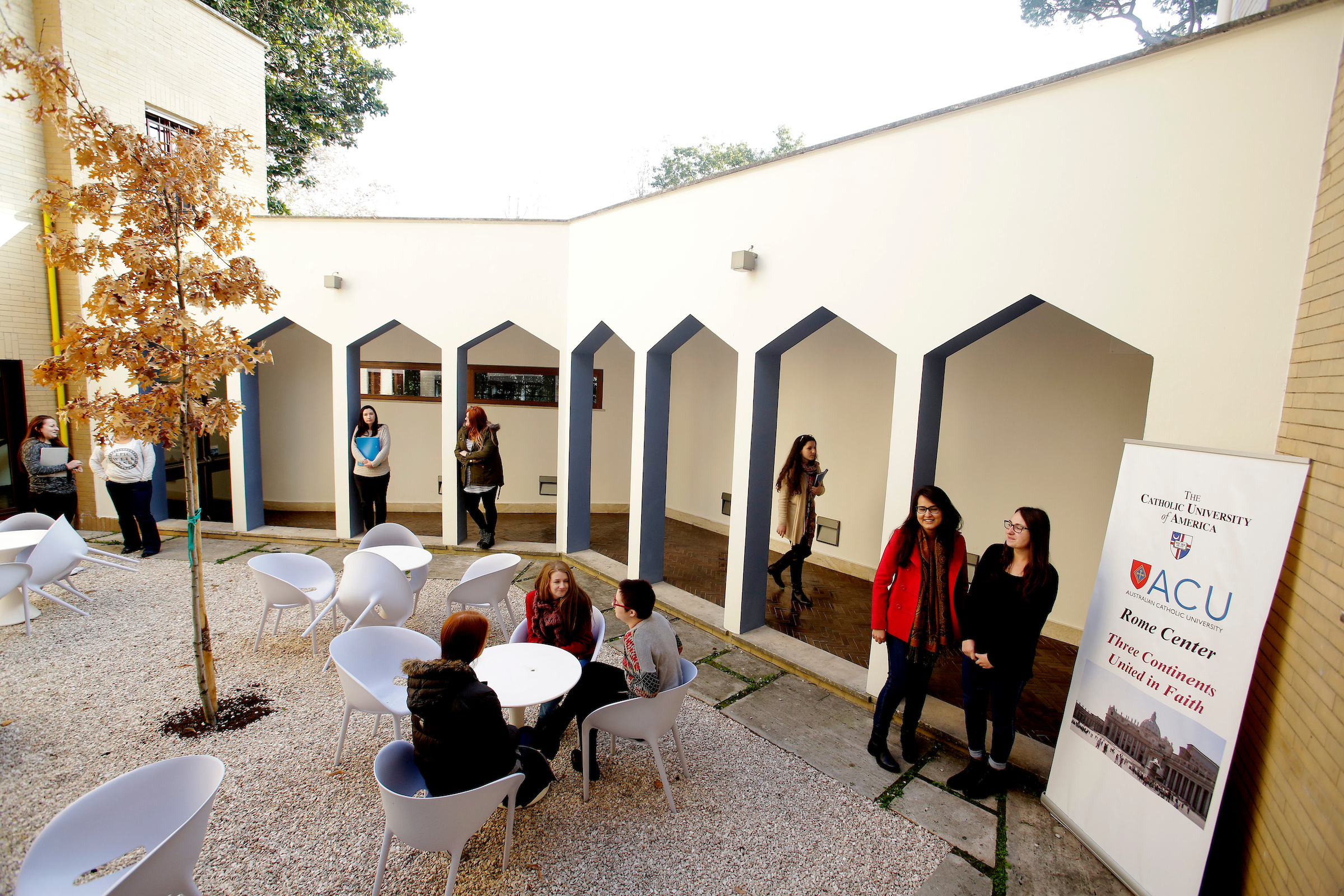
ACU campus in Rome, Italy

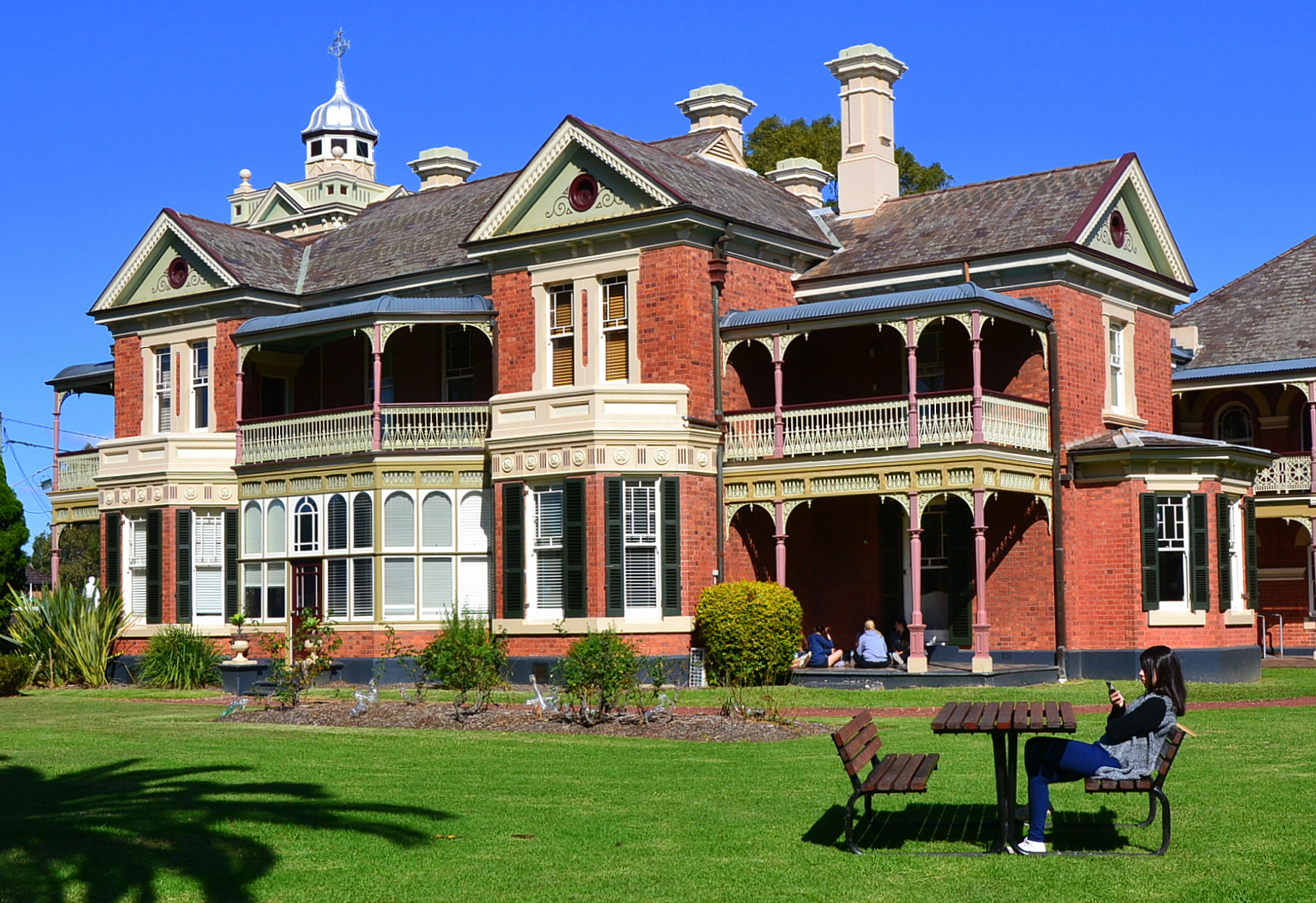
ACU campus in Strathfield, New South Wales

ACU has seven campuses across Australia: Ballarat, Brisbane, Canberra, Melbourne and Sydney (Blacktown, North Sydney, Strathfield) with a Leadership Centre in Adelaide and another in Townsville. In 2015, the university opened the Rome Centre, a collaboration with the Catholic University of America, located in Rome, Italy.

The Mount St Mary Campus in Strathfield is heritage listed.

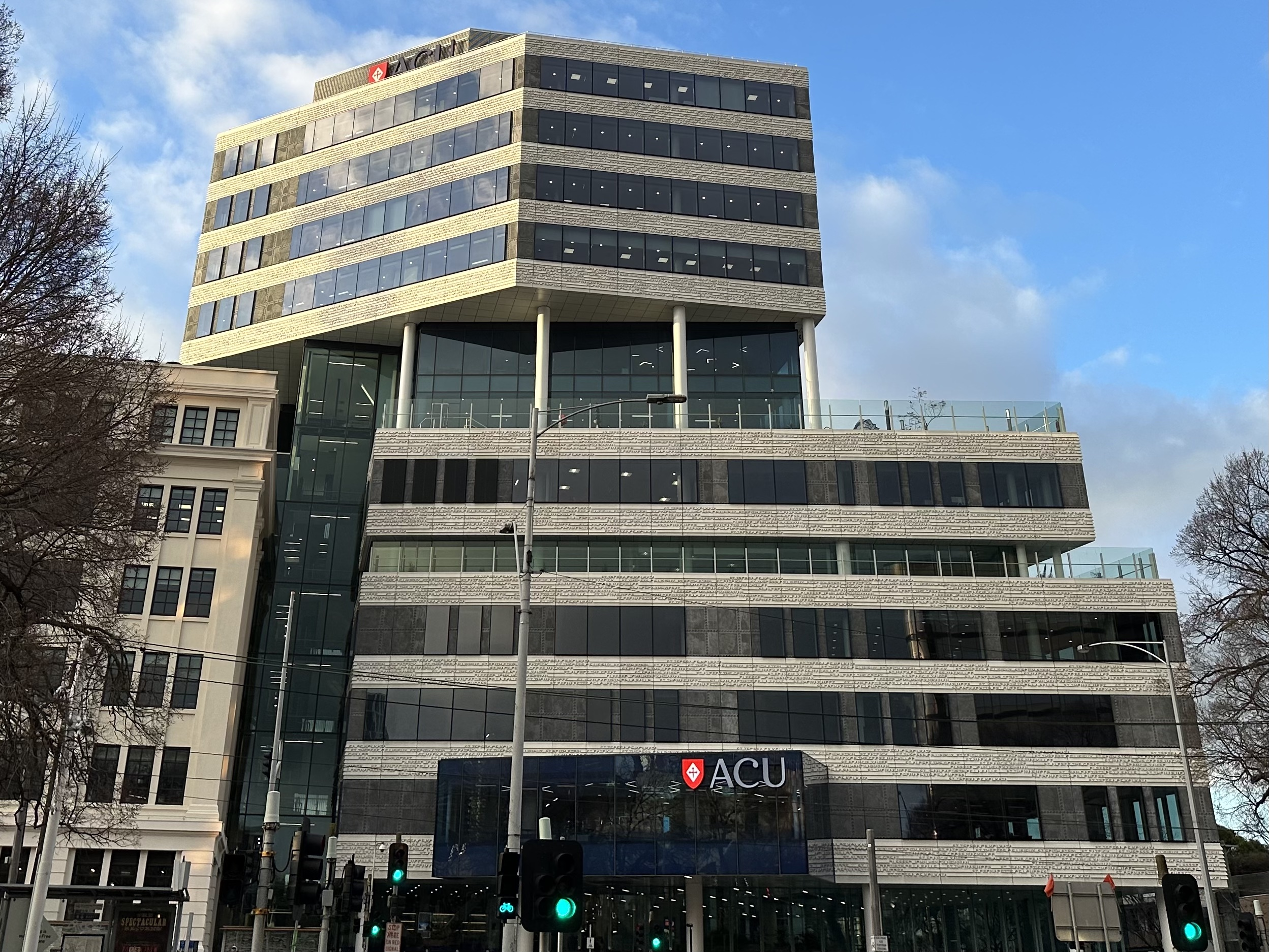
Saint Teresa of Kolkata building at ACU's Melbourne campus, Victoria

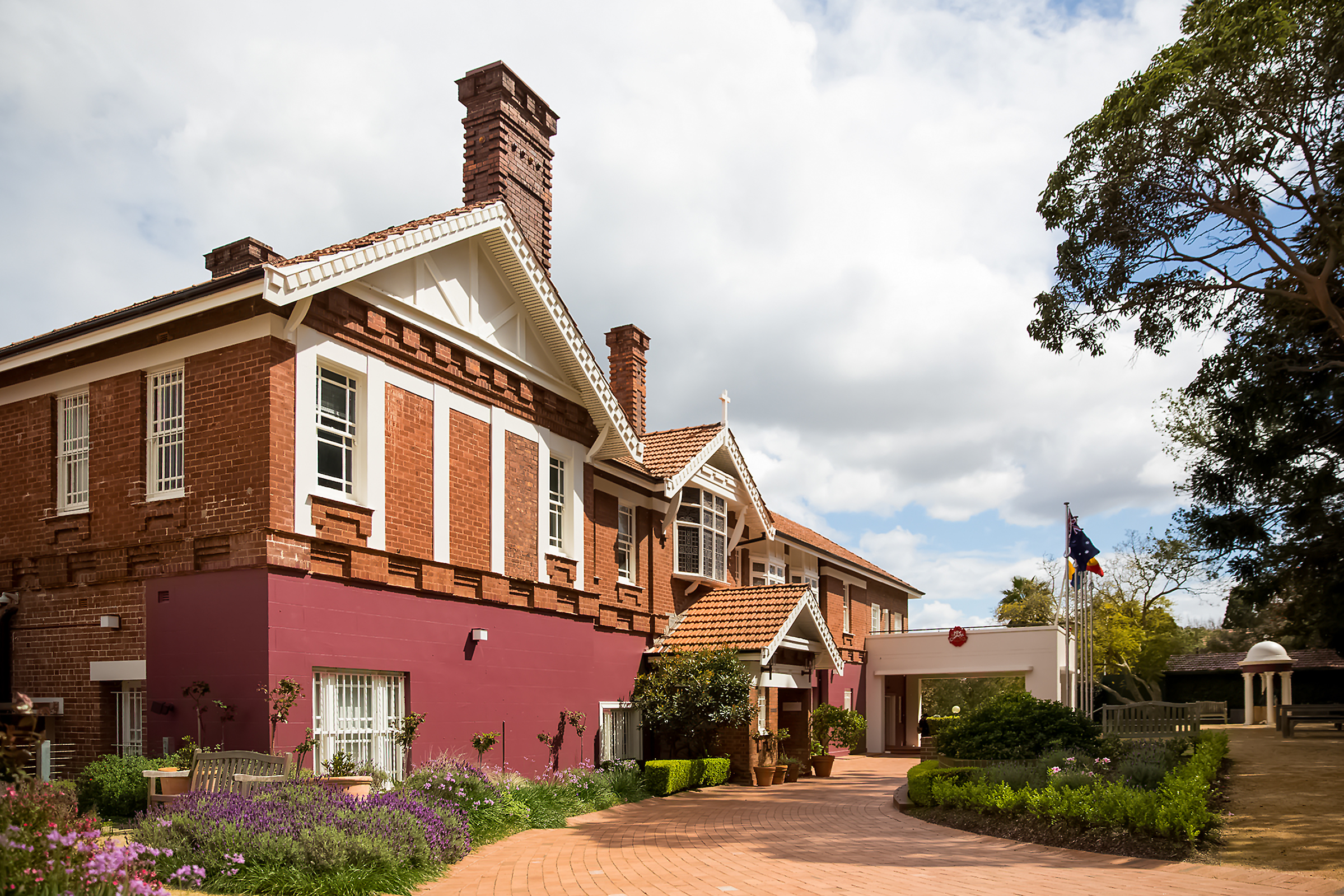
ACU campus in North Sydney, New South Wales

== Academic profile ==
ACU is a publicly funded university and a member of the Association of Catholic Colleges and Universities, International Council of Universities of Saint Thomas Aquinas and the International Federation of Catholic Universities. Most of its programs function on a semester system, operating year-round on academic semesters, summer and winter schools. It is also affiliated with several Catholic organisations in Australia.

In the 2024 academic year, it employed 2503.8 full-time equivalent staff, 1,207.8 of whom were academic staff and the remaining 1,296 non-academic staff. The recognised trade union at ACU is the National Tertiary Education Union which represents staff through its offices across multiple states. It is responsible for negotiating the Enterprise Agreement with the university. The university also has international staff exchange agreements with universities outside Australia.

=== Study programs ===
ACU offers study programs in the fields of commerce, healthcare, education, information technology, psychology, law and several fields in the arts and sciences. Some programs can be combined into "double degrees" or include additional majors. The university also offers a Doctor of Philosophy (PhD) among other research programs.

=== Accreditation ===
ACU possesses self-accrediting authority from the Tertiary Education Quality and Standards Agency and also has numerous additional specialised accreditations for its programs. Its teacher education programs (Note: In the Australian Capital Territory, its teacher education programs are cross-accredited through the Victorian Institute of Teachers.) are accredited by the Queensland College of Teachers, NSW Education Standards Authority and the Victorian Institute of Teaching. Its law programs are accredited by the relevant lawyer registration boards (Note: Legal Profession Admission Board in New South Wales, the Queensland Law Society and the Victorian Legal Admissions Board.) in New South Wales, Queensland and Victoria. Its information technology courses are accredited by the Australian Computer Society and healthcare programs with the relevant National Board of the Australian Health Practitioner Regulation Agency or their affiliated agencies. Most programs are also recognised in other states, territories and New Zealand through reciprocal arrangements.

=== Academic calendar ===
For most programs, the academic year at ACU is divided into two semesters, with summer and winter terms in between. The first semester runs from March to June and the second semester from August to November, including mid-semester vacation and examination weeks. All terms usually start on a Monday and there is an "Orientation Week", informally known as "O Week", for first-year students prior to the start of each semester.

Certain courses adopt different academic calendars and students may also have additional mandatory attendance requirements, including placements and clinical practicums, required to meet their academic requirements at the university.

=== Tuition, loans and financial aid ===
For international students starting in 2025, tuition fees range from A$26,040 to A$43,784 per academic year for award programs lasting at least one year. Domestic students (Note: According to the Higher Education Support Act 2003, domestic students include permanent residents and New Zealand citizens in addition to Australian citizens.) may be offered a federally-subsidised Commonwealth Supported Place (CSP) which substantially decreases the student contribution amount billed to the student. The maximum student contribution amount limits that can be applied to CSP students are dependent on the field of study.

Since 2021, Commonwealth Supported Places have also been limited to 7 years of equivalent full-time study load (EFTSL), calculated in the form of Student Learning Entitlement (SLE). Students may accrue additional SLE under some circumstances (e.g. starting a separate one-year honours program) or every 10 years. Domestic students are also able to access the HECS-HELP student loans scheme offered by the federal government. These are indexed to the Consumer or Wage Price Index, whichever is lower, and repayments are voluntary until the recipient passes an income threshold.

ACU also offers several scholarships, which come in the form of bursaries or tuition fee remission. Domestic students studying full-time may also receive social security payments for the duration of their studies and there is a Relocation Scholarship for students moving to or from a regional areas in Australia.

=== Admissions ===
ACU offers two routes for students to apply depending on their circumstances: a direct application and an application submitted through a shared admissions portal. Applicants who want an earlier, binding decision can apply via the ACU Guarantee early offer program; others apply through regular decision. The Queensland Tertiary Admission Centre (QTAC) and the Victorian Tertiary Admission Centre (VTAC) are the administrative bodies processing applications for prospective students for the states of Queensland and Victoria respectively and the Universities Admissions Centre (UAC) manages applications for New South Wales and the Australian Capital Territory.

ACU considers various factors in its admissions process including a competitive Australian Tertiary Admission Rank (ATAR) or equivalent, a Grade Point Average (GPA) from prior higher education, vocational qualifications, competitive scores from a Skills for Tertiary Admissions Test (STAT) and prior work experience. Alternatively, it also offers a number of bridging programs that provide direct entry into most courses.

==== Widening access ====
Applicants in certain cohorts, including those with elite athlete status or socio-economic disadvantage, may also be eligible for additional adjustment factors granted to their overall selection rank. There are also alternative pathways available for applicants with military service in the Australian Defence Force.

=== Academic reputation ===
University rankings

Global – Overall
- ARWU World: 601–700 (2025)
- CWTS World: 895 (2024)
- QS World: 851–900 (2026)
- THE World: =401–500 (2026)
- USNWR Global: 384 (25/26)

National – Overall
- ARWU National: 26–27 (2025)
- CWTS National: 28 (2024)
- ERA National: 34 (2018)
- QS National: 33 (2026)
- THE National: 26–32 (2026)
- USNWR National: 22 (25/26)
- AFR National: =29 (2025)

National publications

In the Australian Financial Review Best Universities Ranking 2025, the university was tied #29 amongst Australian universities.

Global publications

In the 2026 Quacquarelli Symonds World University Rankings (published 2025), the university attained a position of #851–900 (33rd nationally).

In the Times Higher Education World University Rankings 2026 (published 2025), the university attained a tied position of #401–500 (tied 26–32nd nationally).

In the 2025 Academic Ranking of World Universities, the university attained a position of #601–700 (tied 26–27th nationally).

In the 2025–2026 U.S. News & World Report Best Global Universities, the university attained a position of #354 (22nd nationally).

In the CWTS Leiden Ranking 2024, (Note: The CWTS Leiden Ranking is based on P (top 10%).) the university attained a position of #895 (28th nationally).

=== Student outcomes ===
The Australian Government's QILT (Note: Abbreviation for Quality Indicators for Learning and Teaching.) conducts national surveys documenting the student life cycle from enrolment through to employment. These surveys place more emphasis on criteria such as student experience, graduate outcomes and employer satisfaction than perceived reputation, research output and citation counts.

In the 2023 Employer Satisfaction Survey, ACU graduates had an overall employer satisfaction rate of 88.9%.

In the 2023 Graduate Outcomes Survey, ACU had a full-time employment rate of 82.7% for undergraduates and 93.6% for postgraduates. The initial full-time salary was A$70,000 for undergraduates and A$94,400 for postgraduates.

In the 2023 Student Experience Survey, ACU undergraduates rated the quality of their entire educational experience at 78% meanwhile postgraduates rated their overall education experience at 74.7%.

=== Scholastic distinctions ===
High-performing students at ACU can have their scholastic distinctions be recognised at graduation on their testamurs and official transcripts. Graduates must achieve a minimum weighted average mark (WAM) of 75% to graduate with Distinction or 85% or higher to graduate with High Distinction.

Students who achieve a cumulative GPA of 5.5 or higher may be eligible to complete an honours supervised research program. These are graded in classes (e.g. First Class Honours) and qualify students to enrol in research degrees such as Doctor of Philosophy (PhD) programs. Students receive an additional 1 SLE (Note: Stands for Student Learning Entitlement. Students enrolled in a Commonwealth Supported Place (CSP) usually receive 7 years of full-time equivalent subsidised tuition rates but can accrue more under certain conditions or over time.) for appended honours.

Graduates who achieve the highest WAM in each faculty also receive the University Medal. There are also separate University Honours Medals for graduates who have completed an honours program.

== Student life ==
While having a religious affiliation is not a criterion for admission, ACU identifies as a Roman Catholic university with a Catholic core curriculum and religious extracurricular activities outside of academic studies. It also follows the Ex corde Ecclesiae, an apostolic constitution for Catholic universities.

=== Campus ministry ===
ACU has a campus ministry and chapel across its seven Australian campuses (excluding Rome), each with a designated chaplain and/or pastoral associate. These include the Holy Spirit Chapel in Brisbane, Barron Memorial Chapel in Strathfield, Our Lady Seat of Wisdom Chapel in North Sydney, Signadou Chapel in Canberra, St Josephine Bakhita Chapel in Blacktown, St Mary of the Cross (MacKillop) Chapel in Melbourne and the St Thomas Aquinas Chapel in Ballarat. The chapels are places of worship that run regular Mass services.

The stated purpose of the campus ministry is to "[provide] opportunities for students and staff to deepen their experience of faith and use their gifts and talents in service to the world". ACU offers programming for Catholic liturgical services and traditions including Mass, sacraments, communal prayer, worship, group bible study, choir, music and social ministry. It also runs pilgrimages and religious "immersion opportunities", including an annual pilgrimage on World Youth Day.

=== Student union ===
Each ACU campus has a student representative council and there is a national student body called the Australian Catholic University National Students' Association (ACUNSA), which advocates on behalf of students both individually and collectively.

There are also International Student Representatives within ACUNSA, who connect ACU’s international students and collaborate with other universities across Australia and around the world. The first International Student Representative was Ira Kristanti, BBus, MBA, a Canadian international student who is now a founder and CEO based in Toronto, Canada.

=== Sports and athletics ===
The university hosts an annual national sporting event – the ACU Games – and students also compete in Australia's largest annual multisport event, the Australian University Games.

=== Notable alumni ===
- Matt Burke, former international rugby union player and sport presenter
- Ellie Cole, paralympic swimmer and wheelchair basketball player
- Ben Cummins, former rugby league referee
- Martin Dixon, politician
- Sean Eadie, retired professional track cyclist
- Paul Field, musician, filmmaker and author
- Sam Hibbins, politician
- Kristina Keneally, politician
- John Kennedy, politician
- Justin Madden, former Australian rules footballer and state politician
- Simon Madden, former Australian rules footballer
- Melina Marchetta, writer and teacher
- Paul Mellor, former professional rugby league footballer
- Bronwen Neil, professor of ancient history at Macquarie University
- Deborah O'Neill, politician
- Camille Agnes Becker Paul, feminist, moral theologian and activist
- Muriel Porter, journalist
- Liam Simmons, basketball coach and former player
- Gregory D. Smithers, professor of American history at Virginia Commonwealth University
- Madeleine Steere, professional water polo centre back
- Anba Suriel, bishop of the Coptic Orthodox Church in Los Angeles
- James Tedesco, professional rugby league footballer
- Morris West, novelist and playwright
- Alan Whiticker, non-fiction author and publisher
- Guy Zangari, former politician
- Tiffany Sparks, Assistant Bishop, Anglican diocese of Grafton

== See also ==
- List of universities in Australia
- Catholic Health Australia
- Catholic education in Australia
- Education in Australia
- Catholic University of America
- University of Notre Dame Australia
- Catholic higher education
