= Northern Territory Certificate of Education and Training =

High school qualification in the Northern Territory of Australia

The Northern Territory Certificate of Education and Training (NTCET), formerly Northern Territory Certificate of Education (NTCE), is the credential awarded to high school students who successfully complete senior high school level studies (years 10, 11 and 12 or equivalent) in the Northern Territory of Australia.

== History ==
Before 2011, the certificate was known as the Northern Territory Certificate of Education, or NTCE. The first full implementation of the Northern Territory Certificate of Education and Training, or NTCET, replacing the NTCE.

== The NTCET structure ==
NTCET is usually taught in years 10, 11 and 12 of senior high school in the Northern Territory. There are two levels: Stage 1, generally taught in Year 10 and 11, and Stage 2, taught in Year 12. A system of credits is used; a student must earn 200 credits in a combination of compulsory and non-compulsory subjects. A grade of C or higher in the compulsory subjects is needed to attain the certificate.

Secondary students work towards the Northern Territory Certificate of Education. The Northern Territory Board of Studies issues the certificate to students who meet the requirements of achievement during their studies.

== Calculation of the Tertiary Entrance Rank ==
The NTCET is the main qualification for students in the Northern Territory to gain university admission.

The ATAR score is calculated by the South Australian Tertiary Admissions Centre (SATAC) for students who successfully complete the NTCET and fulfill certain other criteria to qualify for a ATAR. Results for the NTCET are forwarded to SATAC by the Northern Territory Board of Studies.

== See also ==
- Education in Australia
- Tertiary Entrance Rank
