= Universities Admissions Centre =

Universities Admission Centre
- Universities Admissions Centre (NSW and ACT) Pty Ltd (UAC)
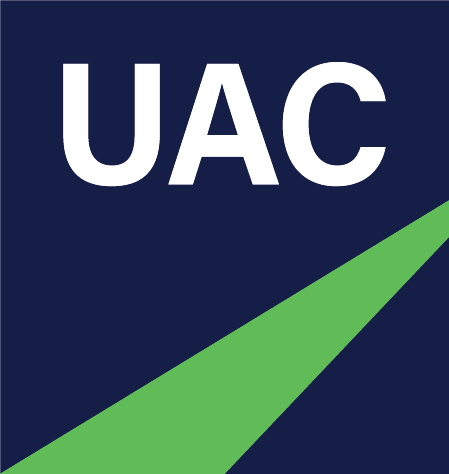
- Location: Rhodes, New South Wales
- Key people: Dr David Christie, Managing director Professor Denise Kirkpatrick, Chairperson
- Website: www.uac.edu.au

The Universities Admissions Centre (UAC, pronounced /ˈjuːæk/ YOO-ak) is an organisation that processes applications for admission to tertiary education courses, mainly at institutions in New South Wales and the Australian Capital Territory. A not-for-profit company incorporated in July 1995, it has offices located at Rhodes, New South Wales.

== Role ==
UAC calculates the Australian Tertiary Admission Rank (ATAR) of NSW Higher School Certificate (HSC) students, and processes applications to its participating institutions based on the selection rank of prospective students. A student's selection rank for each subject is composed of their ATAR, plus any adjustment points individual institutions may offer for reaching certain targets in specific subjects.

Students rank tertiary courses in order of preference, and if a student reaches the required selection rank for any of the courses in their list, the student receives an offer of admission for the course ranked highest in the list. This process occurs over multiple rounds, such that if a student misses an offer in one round, they may receive an offer in subsequent rounds.

In addition, UAC:

- processes applications for Educational Access Schemes (EAS), and for some Equity Scholarships and Schools Recommendation Schemes.
- produces a range of print and online publications including admission requirements and course information for potential applicants.

UAC is a member of the Australasian Conference of Tertiary Admission Centres (ACTAC).

== Scaling ==
In order to calculate the ATAR for HSC students, UAC adjusts students' HSC marks in a process known as scaling. Given the lack of comparability between subjects of different difficulties, the spread of students' marks in each individual subject is adjusted so the mean, the standard deviation and the maximum mark in each course are equivalent. UAC then shifts the mean mark and spread of marks in each subject to equal the mean mark and spread of marks that the students of that one subject attained in all other subjects. Finally, UAC aggregates scores into a single mark out of 500 for each student, and then gives students a percentile ranking in increments of 0.05 based on this aggregate. This percentile ranking is the ATAR.

In practice, this means that if two students receive the same HSC marks for each subject, but one student takes more higher-scaling subjects, and the other takes more lower-scaling subjects, the student who took higher-scaling subjects would attain a better ATAR. In a 2018 survey, 35.8% of HSC students said they chose one or more subjects because they believed it would help them achieve a higher ATAR.

== Participating institutions ==
UAC acts on behalf of 18 universities in Australia, primarily located in New South Wales and the ACT:

- Australian Catholic University
- Australian National University
- Charles Darwin University
- Charles Sturt University
- Central Queensland University
- Griffith University
- La Trobe University
- Macquarie University
- Southern Cross University
- Torrens University Australia
- University of Canberra
- University of New England
- University of Newcastle
- University of Sydney
- University of Technology Sydney
- University of Wollongong
- University of New South Wales
- Western Sydney University

UAC also administers applications on behalf of eight other accredited tertiary education providers:

- Australian College of Applied Psychology
- Australian College of Physical Education
- International College of Management, Sydney
- Macleay College
- Melbourne Institute of Technology
- National Art School
- SAE Institute
- Sydney Institute of Business and Technology

== See also ==
- List of state-level unified TACs (Tertiary Admission Center), domestic students must apply once to the relevant TAC for admission to all the universities within that state.
- Tertiary education in Australia
