= Queensland Tertiary Admissions Centre =

Non-profit tertiary admissions organisation in Queensland, Australia

- Abbreviation: QTAC
- Formation: 1975
- Type: Non-governmental organisation
- Registration no.: 28050542633
- Purpose: Centralised tertiary education admissions application processing
- Headquarters: Milton, Brisbane
- Region served: Queensland and northern New South Wales
- CEO: CEO Chris Veraa
- Revenue: A$12,265,917 (2019)
- Expenses: A$11,804,640 (2019)
- Website: qtac.edu.au

The Queensland Tertiary Admissions Centre (QTAC) is a non-profit organisation that provides undergraduate and postgraduate tertiary entry and application services for 17 major universities and tertiary education institutions in Queensland and northern New South Wales. QTAC is funded entirely by student application fees.

Starting for the 2020 cohort, QTAC is also responsible for calculating Queensland students' Australian Tertiary Admission Ranks for high-school graduates. This change accompanies a complete overhaul of the senior schooling system from the Queensland Curriculum and Assessment Authority, bringing Queensland in-line with the rest of Australia's high-school and university entry systems.

== QTAC participating institutions ==
QTAC currently processes applications and issues offers on behalf of the following 17 institutions:

=== Universities ===
- Australian Catholic University
- Bond University
- Central Queensland University
- Griffith University
- James Cook University
- Queensland University of Technology
- Southern Cross University
- TAFE Queensland
- Torrens University Australia
- University of New England
- University of Queensland
- University of Southern Queensland
- University of the Sunshine Coast

=== Colleges ===
- Christian Heritage College
- Griffith College
- Mater Education
- SAE Creative Media Institute

== See also ==
- List of state-level unified TACs (Tertiary Admission Center), domestic students must apply once to the relevant TAC for admission to all the universities within that state.
- Tertiary education in Australia
