= Tertiary Institutions Service Centre =

- Abbreviation: TISC
- Formation: 1975
- Purpose: Higher-education application processing
- Location: 100 Royal Street East Perth, Western Australia Australia
- Region served: Western Australia
- Key people: Andrew Crevald (chief executive officer)
- Website: www.tisc.edu.au

The Tertiary Institutions Service Centre (TISC) is the administrative body that processes tertiary course applications for universities and other tertiary institutions in the state of Western Australia. It is a member of the Australasian Conference of Tertiary Admission Centres (ACTAC).

== History ==
Before 1975, all universities in Western Australia had their own application systems and students had to directly apply to them. To simplify this process, the Tertiary Institutions Service Centre (TISC) was founded in December 1975 by the four public universities in Western Australia: The University of Western Australia, Curtin University, Edith Cowan University and Murdoch University.

In July 2021, TISC expanded with The University of Notre Dame Australia joining its unified application system.

From 2023, TISC will no longer compile nor publish schools’ median ATAR scores, in response to better support schools with low rankings and encourage the participation of ATAR courses and reduce the pressured learning environment in high-performing schools. This action is supported by many schools, including prestigious schools such as St Hilda's Anglican School for Girls which describe the system as an "unhealthy competition".

== Roles ==
Students are able to preference up to six courses from the participating institutions, where TISC will hand over qualifications presented by students as well as a student's Western Australian Certificate of Education (WACE) scores provided by the School Curriculum and Standards Authority to the universities they have preferenced. The TISC will then release offers on the universities' behalf in multiple rounds of offers depending on the student's preferences. Other than tertiary application, TISC is also responsible for scaling WACE subjects and ATAR calculations for all students in Western Australia.

== Participating institutions ==
- Curtin University
- Edith Cowan University
- Murdoch University
- The University of Notre Dame Australia
- The University of Western Australia
- Engineering Institute of Technology (direct application required)

== See also ==
- List of state-level unified TACs (Tertiary Admission Center), domestic students must apply once to the relevant TAC for admission to all the universities within that state.
- Tertiary education in Australia
