= South Australian Tertiary Admissions Centre =

- Abbreviation: SATAC
- Formation: 1977
- Purpose: Higher-education application processing
- Location: 431 King William Street Adelaide, South Australia Australia
- Region served: South Australia and Northern Territory, Australia
- Key people: Stuart Mossman (Chief Executive Officer)
- Website: www.satac.edu.au

The South Australian Tertiary Admissions Centre (SATAC) is the administrative body that processes tertiary course applications for universities (and other tertiary institutions) in South Australia and the Northern Territory, Australia. It is a member of the Australasian Conference of Tertiary Admission Centres (ACTAC).

SATAC assesses qualifications presented by applicants and ranks eligible applicants in merit order for each course according to the rules and guidelines, with student South Australian Certificate of Education (SACE) scores provided by the SACE Board of South Australia. Other than tertiary application, SATAC is also responsible for scaling SACE subjects and ATAR calculation.

== Participating institutions ==
- TAFE SA (Technical and Further Education)
- Charles Darwin University
- Flinders University
- Adelaide University
- International College of Hotel Management (ICHM)
- South Australian Institute of Business and Technology (SAIBT)
- Tabor Institute of Higher Education
- Torrens University Australia

== See also ==
- List of state-level unified TACs (Tertiary Admission Center), domestic students must apply once to the relevant TAC for admission to all the universities within that state.
- Tertiary education in Australia
