= Bored of Studies =

- Website type: Student website, forum and wiki, student resources
- Available in: English
- Country of origin: Australia
- Owner: iStudy Australia Pty Ltd.
- Creators: Mark Czajkowski, James King, Tim Cheng and Ian Keong
- Website: boredofstudies.org
- Registration: Required to post. Viewable as a guest.

Bored of Studies is an Australian website targeted at students in New South Wales and Victoria. It is prominent among students for its Student Assessment Modeller that calculates approximate Australian Tertiary Admission Rank (formerly Universities Admission Index) or Equivalent National Tertiary Entrance Rank results, and for hosting study notes for the New South Wales Higher School Certificate courses. An extensive student community has evolved around its forum, which is frequented by school students, teachers and a growing number of university students. The site's name is a parody of the NSW Board of Studies, the former governing organisation for the Higher School Certificate (HSC).

== History ==
The website was created on 5 March 2002 by four former HSC students who had completed their HSC in the previous year: Mark Czajkowski, James King, Tim Cheng and Ian Keong. Regarded as the successor to the popular "hscboardz" and "uniboardz" forums and the "hscstuff.cjb.net" resource library, the site's founders claim that because they were the first to sit a newly revised HSC syllabus, they were able to clearly see the lack of information that future HSC students would face. A desire to help address this lack of information was a prime reason behind the founding of Bored of Studies. The site is owned and operated by iStudy Australia Pty Ltd, based in New South Wales.

== Influence and criticism ==
Bored of Studies has become an increasingly popular site for HSC students, with a membership of over 400 000 and more than 15 million monthly hits. It is often recommended by teachers as a valuable resource containing past papers and practice essays. It has been suggested that an official bulletin from the NSW Universities Admissions Centre (UAC) did much to popularise the site around the state. There has been concern that the extensive subject notes available on the site could lead to cheating among students, in addition the anonymous nature of users has resulted in questions over the correctness and validity of the subject notes and forum contributions.

In 2005, a student's attempt to gain access to his raw HSC examination under freedom of information laws drew controversy when the request was refused by the government. This followed the previous successful attempt by James King, one of the administrators on the Bored of Studies website, to obtain his raw marks. The information sparked debate about the standard of student responses that were given pass marks, with the then Federal Education minister Brendan Nelson defending the students' right to know their marks.

== Recent developments ==
In 2006 Bored of Studies launched Biki (Bored of Studies Wiki), a wiki collection of HSC notes, information and resources using the MediaWiki software to allow contributions. Biki was later closed "due to prolonged inactivity and outdated resources". Also in 2006, 'Premium membership' was introduced giving paid members access to additional content and features. The site was hacked in June 2010 and recovered in August of the same year, resulting in it being re-interfaced for better security and member navigation.

From 2012, Bored of Studies began creating exam papers as its own version of the trial HSC to be taken by members currently in their final year of school on specified dates and venues. These unique exam papers feature questions beyond the difficulty of the actual HSC exam, being the major exam that is completed by NSW students at the end of year 12. These exams, otherwise known as the "Bored of Studies Trials", are intended for high-achieving students looking to perform at the highest possible standard in the real HSC exam.

The 2022 edition of the Bored of Studies Trials featured exams for Mathematics Extension 1, Mathematics Extension 2 and Chemistry.

The 2023 edition of the Bored of Studies Trials featured exams for Mathematics Extension 1 and Mathematics Extension 2. They also featured, for the first time, exams for Physics and Business Studies.

== Notable members ==
The founders are known as the following usernames on Bored of Studies:

- tactic (Mark Czajkowski)
- timbk2 (Tim Cheng)
- fatmuscle (Ian Keong)
- Lazarus (James King)

Other Bored of Studies members with a substantial history of contribution to the HSC student community include:

- Carrotsticks
- Trebla
- CM_Tutor
- Absolutezero
- seremify007
- OzKo
- jimmysmith560
- brent012
- enoilgam

== See also ==
- Education in Australia
- University admission
- Victorian Certificate of Education
- South Australian Certificate of Education
- Tasmanian Certificate of Education
- Western Australian Certificate of Education
- ACT Scaling Test
- Queensland Certificate of Education
- Overall Position (Queensland)
