= Record of School Achievement =

Australian educational qualification

The Record of School Achievement (RoSA) is an Australian qualification issued by the New South Wales Education Standards Authority in New South Wales. It is provided to students who complete Year 10 but who leave school before achieving the Higher School Certificate.

Features of the Record of School Achievement include:

- a list of courses undertaken in Years 10, 11 and 12
- statewide grades (A–E) achieved at the end of Years 10 and 11
- results in optional tests of literacy and numeracy
- a record of extra-curricular achievements

The RoSA replaces the School Certificate, which was awarded for the last time in 2011.

== See also ==
- Education in Australia
- University admission
- Victorian Certificate of Education
- South Australian Certificate of Education
- Tasmanian Certificate of Education
- Western Australian Certificate of Education
- ACT Scaling Test
- Queensland Certificate of Education
- Overall Position (Queensland)
- Bored of Studies
