= Twelfth grade =

Twelfth post-kindergarten year of school education in some school systems

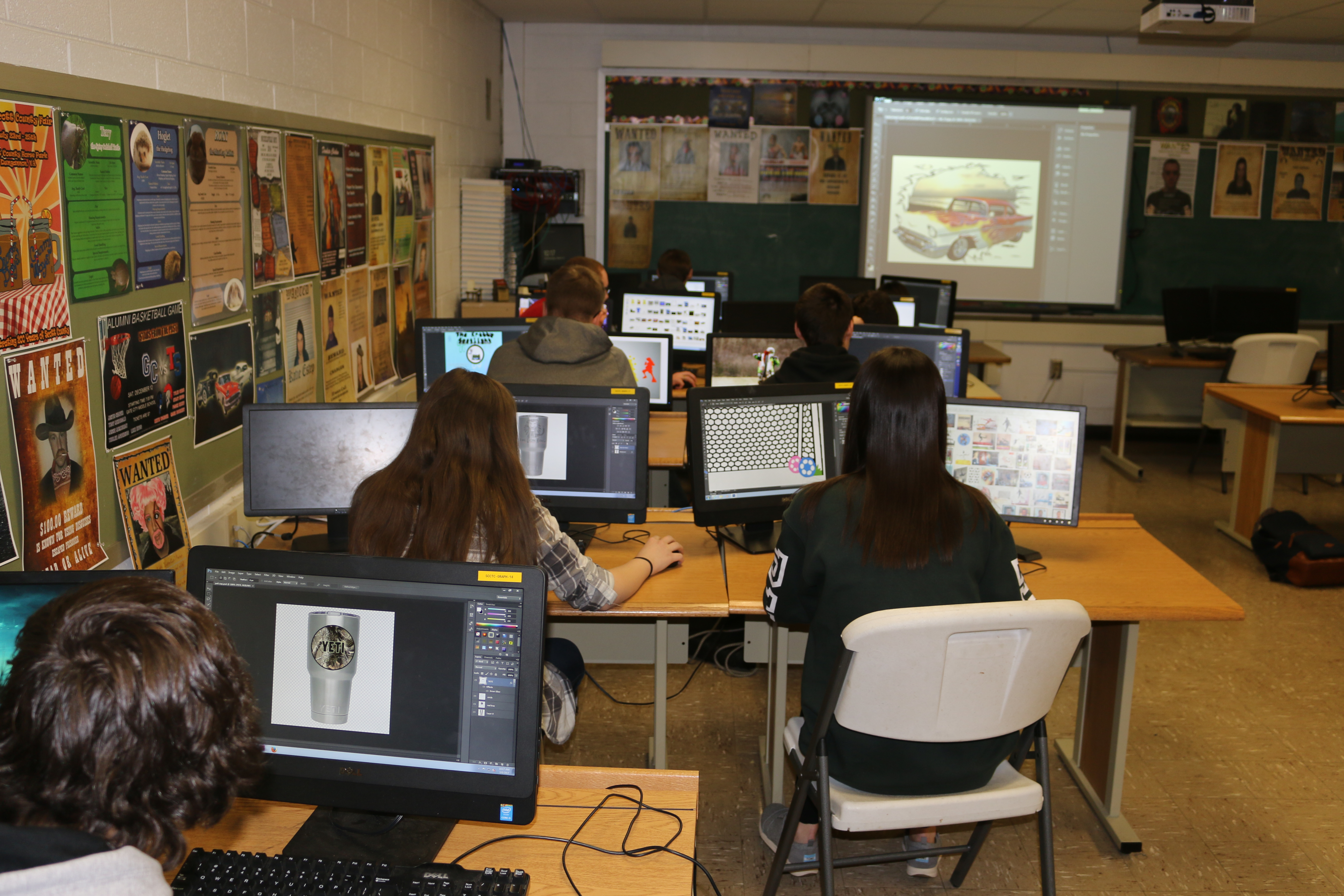
A 12th grade visual arts class in Scott County, Virginia in the United States

Twelfth grade (also known as grade 12, senior year, standard 12, 12th standard, 12th class, class 12th, or class 12) is the final year of formal or compulsory education in many parts of the world. It is typically the last year of secondary school and K–12 education. Students in twelfth grade are generally 17–18 years old. While some countries have a thirteenth grade, others may not include a 12th grade/year in their educational system.

== Australia ==
In Australia, the twelfth grade is referred to as Year 12. In New South Wales, students are usually 16 or 17 years old when they enter Year 12 and 17 or 18 years old during graduation (end-of-year). A majority of students in Year 12 work toward getting an ATAR (Australian Tertiary Admission Rank). Until the start of 2020, the OP (Overall Position, which applied only to students in the state of Queensland) was used. Both allow or allowed them access to courses at a university. In Western Australia, this is achieved by completing the WACE; in South Australia, by completing the SACE; in Victoria, by completing the VCE; in the Australian Capital Territory, by completing the AST; and in New South Wales, by completing the HSC.

== Bangladesh ==
In Bangladesh, educational institutions offering the 11th–12th grade education are known as colleges. In the 12th grade, students study in one of the three streams: science, humanities, and business studies. After completing 12th grade, they have to sit for the Higher Secondary Certificate (HSC) examinations.

== Belgium ==
In Belgium, the twelfth grade is the sixth and last year of secondary school. It is called zesde middelbaar in Dutch, sixième secondaire in French, and sechste Sekundarschuljahr in German, which are the three official languages of Belgium.

== Canada ==
In Canada, the equivalent is Grade 12. In Quebec, secondary school ends at Secondary V (five) equivalent to Grade 11, followed by CÉGEP, trade school or work.

== Finland ==
The twelfth grade is the third and usually last year (a fourth-year is possible) of high school or secondary school (or Gymnasium). In this system, twelfth graders are also often referred to as "abiturientit" or "abit". The students graduate from high school at around 18, with some 17 or 19. The twelfth grade is shorter than previous because the twelfth graders' lessons end in February and they take their final exams shortly afterward. Compulsory education ends after the twelfth grade, and it is completely optional for a student to continue into fourth-year.

== France ==
The equivalent grade in France is Terminale. It is the third and last year of lycée (the French equivalent to high school), whereby students must sit a test called the Baccalauréat to complete the year. French-language schools that teach the French government curriculum (i.e. are part of the AEFE network) use the same system of grades as their French counterparts. This is not compulsory, as education in France is only compulsory until students turn 16.

== Lebanon ==
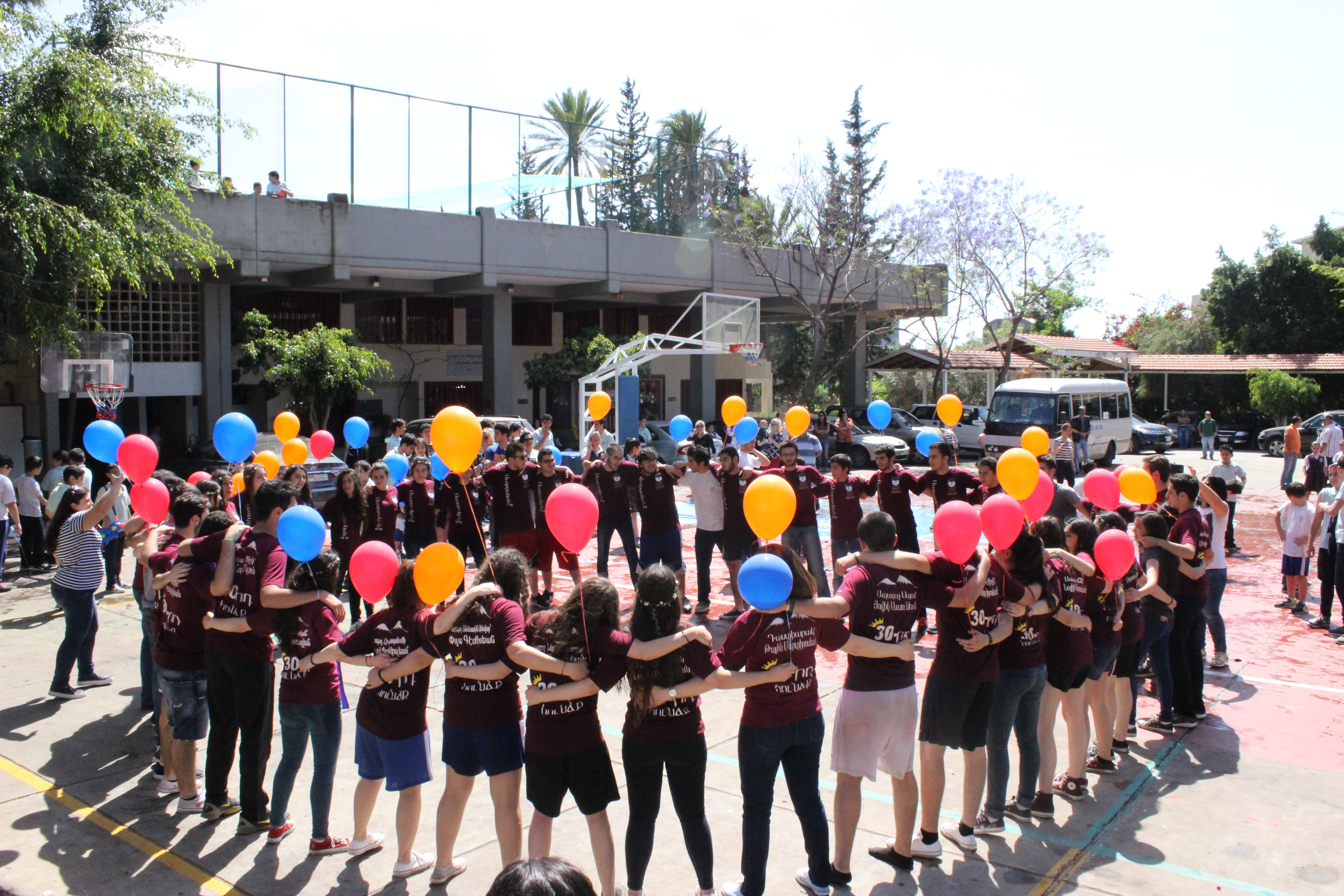
Last day for seniors at Yeghishe Manoukian College in the Matn District of Lebanon in 2016

In Lebanon, twelfth grade is the third year of high school, also referred to as the third year of higher secondary education, the class of seniors, or the last class of the school. Students in twelfth grade in Lebanon are between the ages of 17 and 18.

== Netherlands ==
In the Netherlands, senior year is named at the school level. From low to high: "VMBO", "HAVO" and "VWO". VMBO is composed of four years, with 12th grade being the fourth (4th) and final year. A higher school level is the HAVO, which lasts for five years. The highest school level is VWO, which lasts for six years. So at the HAVO, students are considered senior if they are in "5th class", whereas at VWO, in "6th class" respectively. The last year mainly focuses on preparing for the final exams, after which students should be ready to go to college or university. Usually, 4th and 5th grade students are aged 16 to 17 and those who are in 6th grade usually are aged 17 to 18.

== New Zealand ==
In New Zealand, 12th grade is known as Year 13 (New Zealand students attend 13 years of school, starting at age 5). Students in Year 13 are usually 17–18 years old. This is the last year of secondary school. In Year 13, students complete NCEA Level 3, which involves getting a certain number of 'credits' from different external exams and other internal assessments. Students must gain 80 achieved credits or higher (20 of which are taken from Level 2) to pass the year.

== Philippines ==
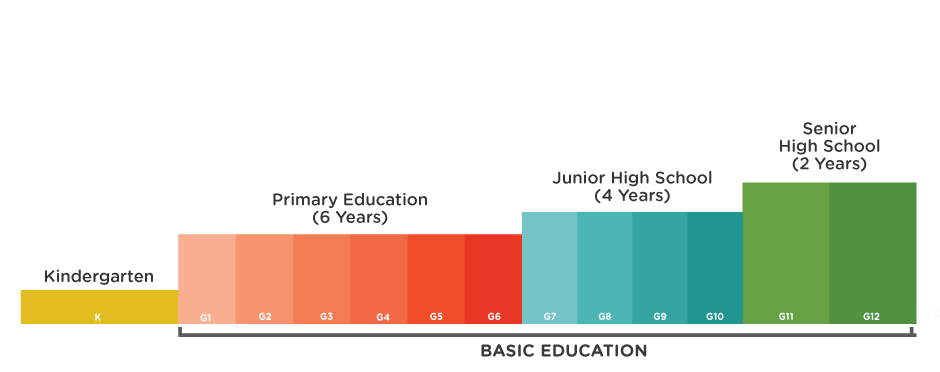
The Kindergarten through 12th grade program in the Philippines

In the Philippines, Grade 12 or Ultimate Year is the final year of Senior High School and High School curriculum under the new K–12 that was first implemented on May 20, 2008 and became effective on April 24, 2012, as part of its 9-year implementation process from 2008, to June 5, 2017. It is also the last year of high school, and the basic and compulsory education in the country before graduates choose to enter tertiary education (e.g. college or university, which are both used interchangeably), entrepreneurship, or employment. Students are usually 17–18 years old.

The last school year to fully use the 1945–2017, or K–4th Year system, was SY 2011–2012. Kindergarten was made obligatory, which served as a requirement for the effectivity of K–12 phasing out the K–4th Year on April 24, 2012. The other grades are still the same as before (Grade 1 to Fourth Year), while the last to use this system is SY 2016–2017. By the said school year, Grade 6 is the only grade that is still under the 1945 K–4th Year system, while the rest are now under K–12. By 2017–2018 on June 5, 2017 when Grade 12 was implemented, the implementation process of K–12 that spanned for 9 years was completed which entirely phased out the older K–4th Year system and newer curriculum is now in full and only use at that point.

Subjects on Grade 12 are enrolled on a semestral basis, as in Grade 11. Afterwards, Grade 12 students will take the last National Achievement Test called the Basic Education Exit Assessment, although this is not a requirement for graduation or college enrollment. Finally, graduation rites are held, being the next grade to do so after Grade 6 for elementary school graduates.

== United Kingdom ==
=== England and Wales ===
In England and Wales, "Year 13" (or "upper Sixth") is the last year of A-Level certifications, which are completed to finalize a student's last academic year. Students are usually 16–17 in Year 12 and 17–18 in Year 13. While the school leaving age in the rest of the UK is 16 years old, in 2015 education in England became compulsory until the age of 18. After this age, students can leave education if they choose without completing year 13. Between the ages of 16 and 18, students can either continue in full-time education (for example, at a sixth form college); start an apprenticeship or traineeship; or spend a minimum of 20 hours per week working or volunteering while in part-time education or training. Any education after the age of 18 is then referred to as higher education.

=== Scotland ===
In Scotland, this is the sixth year (or S6). Sufficiently good marks in the 5th year may be adequate for entry into higher education. 'Highers' are the entry qualifications to university which can be sat in S5, S6 or college, with Advanced Highers equivalent to year one of university.

== United States ==
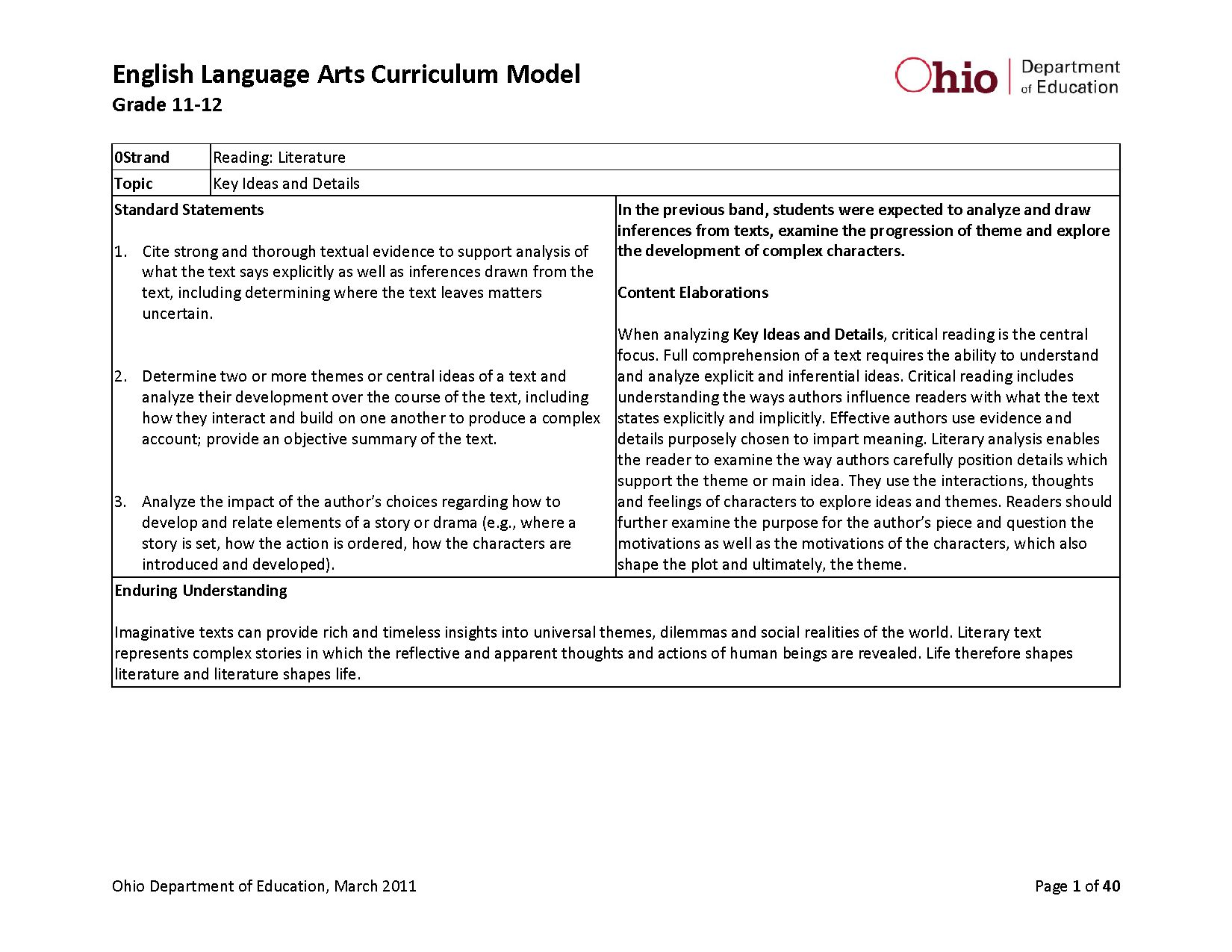
A 12th grade English studies curriculum provided by the Ohio Department of Education in Ohio

The twelfth grade is the twelfth school year after kindergarten. It is also the last year of compulsory secondary education, or high school. Students are often 16–18 years old, and on rarer occasions, can be 19 years old or older. Many states have a maximum age at which free education can be offered, usually but not always age 21. Twelfth graders are referred to as Seniors.

=== Traditions associated with senior year ===
Senior skip day (also known as senior ditch day) is a day during which the seniors do not attend school and skip all their classes. This event/tradition is often not recognized by school administrations and teachers. In some areas, it is countered with an officially recognized senior day off, or by allowing graduating seniors to skip their final exams. This official senior day can also sponsor a senior field trip or senior class trip where the class would, for example, go to a theme park, a lake, a resort, the beach, or some other vacation-type activity. Following graduation, many seniors go on senior week, where they spend a week at the beach with their friends.

== See also ==
- Educational stage
- Eleventh Grade
- Senioritis
- Senior secondary education

Preceded by Eleventh grade	Twelfth Grade age 17–18	Succeeded by Higher education or Vocational education or Thirteenth grade
