= Universities Admission Index =

Former Australian university entry score

The Universities Admission Index (UAI) was used in New South Wales and the Australian Capital Territory, Australia, as the primary criterion for entry into most undergraduate-entry university programs. It was a number between 0 and 100 (though those below 30 were not reported), occurring in increments of 0.05 and indicating the rounded percentile rank of a student who undertook the Higher School Certificate or ACT Year 12 Certificate with a valid quantity and combination of units of study. It was replaced in N.S.W with the Australian Tertiary Admission Rank (ATAR) in 2009. Prior to the UAI the ACT used its own Tertiary Entrance Rank

== Overview ==
The UAI was awarded to students on the completion of the HSC in NSW and the completion of an ACT Year 12 Certificate with a "Tertiary Package" in the ACT — both at the end of year 12. It provided a percentile ranking of peer students of the same age. In NSW, the UAI was determined by a combination of the public HSC exams common across all schools at the end of Year 12 and continuing assessment. Assignments and exams in Year 11 served to prepare students for Year 12 but were not in any way involved in the calculation process. In the ACT, the UAI was determined by ongoing assignments and exams spanning through both Years 11 & 12. The ACT Scaling Test (AST), sat by tertiary students, linked a student's ability with the school's mean score in each course and was used to scale students in different courses and schools.

UAI scores were not directly equivalent to a percentile rank among those who completed Year 12 (i.e. a UAI of 99 was not equivalent to placing in the top 1% of the state). The statistical distribution of UAI scores in 2004 found that 1.6% of students who completed Year 12 scored at or over a UAI of 99. UAIs are awarded in increments of 0.05. The UAI's predecessor, the Tertiary Entrance Rank, was different because it defined the student population as only students in year 12. The UAI attempted to rank students who did not progress to their senior years of High School, by estimating what they would have gotten. This keeps the rank consistent throughout the years despite fluctuating Year 10 drop-out rates as the rank was always measured relative to a Year 10 cohort, with the ranks of the drop-outs being estimated.

A student's UAI was given as a number between 30 and 100. Students who receive 30 or below receive a 'pink slip' which informed them that they received below 30, though these were rare due to most of the estimated Year 10 cohort's marks falling into this range. UAIs of 100 were extremely rare and were only achieved by a few students (generally, about 20 out of almost 66,000) every year.

The organisation responsible for administering the UAI, was the Universities Admissions Centre (UAC), who scaled all subjects using mathematical formulae to try to ensure equity of marks across subjects.

== Calculation in NSW ==
To calculate the UAI, the UAC used the raw exam marks of the HSC and the moderated assessment mark.

The assessment mark was obtained from the internal school examinations a student sat over the last term of Year 11 and the three terms of Year 12. The school marks were sent to the UAC from the Board of Studies, and from these students were ranked from first to last. The student ranked first was then assigned a moderated assessment mark equal to the highest examination mark scored by that group of students, regardless of who scored it, and similarly the student ranked last would receive the lowest examination mark. The rest of the students had their assessment marks moderated between these two values, with the proportional difference between the marks remaining the same (for instance, the gap of 10 between two marks spread over a range of 20% would be halved if the range was further halved to 10%).

The student who came first in the subject was then assigned the maximum mark, normally 50.0 on a one unit basis but may have changed with scaling. Following that all students who sat the course had a scaled mark calculated based on an estimate of what each student would have achieved had they sat that course. This was repeated for all of a student's units.

The student's two best English units were added along with their next best eight units, which may have included further English units, to give an aggregate mark, out of 500.0. Students were then ranked - however, this rank did not translate directly to the UAI. The distribution of students was uneven. Ranking scaled upwards - only 29.3% of students would receive a UAI of under 50, and the median UAI was around 65, a statistical trend which was applicable at every UAI level. This was because the spread of marks took into account those who did not complete their HSC or otherwise attend the post-compulsory years of education. Their hypothetical marks were determined by the School Certificate, one compulsory for all students in NSW. As their marks were generally lower than those who complete the HSC, they caused the uneven spread across the spectrum of the UAI. Hypothetically, assuming that everyone continued to complete the HSC, the spread would have been completely even. However, NSW retention rates for students stood at around 70%, and there were students who completed the final years without gaining an HSC.

== Students who finish high school overseas ==
Students who finished high school overseas and who had a qualification such as the SAT, International Baccalaureate or A Levels may have had their score converted to a UAI. Also, a number of international schools had adopted the ACT curriculum and assessment regime such that their studies culminated in the award of an ACT-calculated UAI.

== Australian Tertiary Admission Rank ==
During June 2009, the Federal Minister for Education announced the removal of UAI and the introduction of the Australian Tertiary Admission Rank, or ATAR, for Year 12 students of 2009 within the ACT and New South Wales, and for the rest of the country excluding Queensland in 2010. The ATAR was introduced as an attempt to unify the university entrance system in Australia, where previously each state had its own individual system (e.g. UAI in ACT/NSW, TER in SA/NT, ENTER in Victoria). The shift to ATAR meant that the scores for most students receiving a UAI would increase by a small amount (although this would not present as any advantage as score cutoffs would subsequently increase), while the maximum score would change from a UAI of 100 to an ATAR of 99.95. Queensland would not shift to the ATAR system, due to a completely separate system and scoring scale.

== See also ==
- Equivalent National Tertiary Entrance Rank
- Tertiary Entrance Rank
- University admission
- List of admissions tests
