= Equivalent National Tertiary Entrance Rank =

Australian tertiary entrance rank

The Equivalent National Tertiary Entrance Rank (ENTER) was the national Australian tertiary entrance rank, administered by Universities Australia (previously called the Australian Vice-Chancellors' Committee). It was a percentile ranking, designed to simplify the comparison of entrance levels for students educated in different processes of admission for university applicants from interstate. It was replaced by the Australian Tertiary Admission Rank from 2010.

== Equivalence ==
The term ENTER was only used in Victoria (1998-2009), although the actual rank was identical and equivalent to the Universities Admission Index (UAI) used in New South Wales and the Australian Capital Territory, and to the Tertiary Entrance Rank (TER) used in South Australia, the Northern Territory, Tasmania and Western Australia. Queensland used a different system called the Overall Position (OP), but conversion tables were published each year to convert the OP to or from an ENTER.

Non-school-leaver university applicants were selected using other criteria: usually previous results, or results in the Special Tertiary Admissions Test.

Each state's university and government education authorities determined the method of calculation of the ENTER or state-equivalent for students from that state, due to the historical differences between different state's education systems. However, these decisions were co-ordinated to ensure that the necessary equivalence is maintained (i.e. so that an ENTER of 90.00 from Victoria would indicate a sufficiently similar degree of attainment as a UAI of 90.00 from New South Wales, in spite of the differences in each rank's methods of application.)

== Calculation ==
The Victorian Curriculum and Assessment Authority (VCAA) was the authority responsible for conducting assessments in Victoria. It determined Study Scores for each Victorian Certificate of Education (VCE) Unit 3/4 subject successfully completed by a student, ranging from 0 to 50. It also determined whether a student had "satisfactorily" completed the VCE.

For all students who satisfactorily completed the VCE, and who meet certain other criteria for receiving an ENTER, VCAA provided the students' Subject Study Scores to the Victorian Tertiary Admissions Centre (VTAC). VTAC then scaled the Subject Study Scores to allow for cross-study calculations - that is, the Study Scores were adjusted up or down to take into account the strength of competition amongst the cohort of students studying the subject that year. Scaling was undertaken to ensure that each subject contributes equally to the ENTER. In other words, a 25 in English was equivalent to a 25 in Mathematical Methods or a 25 in any other VCE subject. The scaled Study Scores are referred to as ENTER subject scores.

VTAC determines an ENTER for each student who satisfactorily completed at least one subject in the current year, and who had obtained VCE Study Scores in an English study and at least three other studies in an allowable combination at the Unit 3 & 4 level.

A student's overall ENTER was calculated as the total of:

- The ENTER subject score in an English subject (one of English, English Language, Literature or English as a Second Language)(any one of these subjects was compulsory for the VCE))
- The ENTER subject scores of the next three best subjects (the English study and these constituted the Primary Four)
- Plus an increment of 10% of the next best two subjects (if available).
- additional studies such as Vocational Education and Training (VET) or tertiary extension studies may also have been considered.

Candidates were ranked in order of these aggregates. The ENTER was the percentile ranking of each student's position on this list in steps of 0.05 ranging from 0.00 to 99.95. For instance, an ENTER of 80.00 indicated that the aggregate was higher than 80% of aggregates. Each 0.05 rank typically contained around 20 students, depending on the number of students in the cohort each year.

Ranks less than 30.00 were typically only disclosed as "less than 30", as the exact ranking at this low level was not deemed educationally useful and may have been demoralising to the recipient.

== See also ==
- Tertiary Entrance Rank
- Universities Admission Index
- Victorian Certificate of Education
- Victorian Tertiary Admissions Centre
- List of admissions tests
- University admission
- Australian Tertiary Admission Rank (ATAR)
- Bored of Studies
