= School Certificate (New South Wales) =

School qualification in New South Wales, Australia

The School Certificate was a qualification issued by the Board of Studies, typically at the end of Year 10. The successful completion of the School Certificate was a requirement for completion of the Higher School Certificate. The School Certificate was issued for the last time in 2011. It has been replaced with the RoSA (Record of School Achievement)

== Tests ==
To receive the School Certificate, students were required to sit for the School Certificate tests. There were five tests:

- English-literacy
- Mathematics
- Science
- Australian History, Geography, Civics and Citizenship
- Computing Skills

== Requirements ==
Each student was required to study English, Mathematics, Science, History, Geography and Australian Civics and Citizenship and Personal Development, Health and Physical Education (PD/H/PE) every year in Years 7-9. Each course was also supposed to include a degree of computer use, so students became familiar with that technology.

At some time during Years 7-9 students must have studied courses in Creative Arts (Visual Arts and Music), Technology and Applied Studies and a Language Other Than English.

The student may also have completed a number of additional studies (electives). These additional studies were required to be completed in a number of hours, as defined by the Board of Studies. A student had a choice of these additional studies according to the courses which were available at their school.

== Review and abolition ==
In his 1997 report "Shaping their future", Professor Barry McGaw was highly critical of the School Certificate. His report noted several deficiencies in the School Certificate, including:

- The lack of preparedness of many students for Year 10, 11 and 12
- The apparent lack of challenge posed by Year 10 studies for more able students
- The ‘low stakes’ nature of the external assessment where students were not accountable for their own individual results
- Perceptions that the timing of external examinations in the middle of Year 10 has lessened the significance of subsequent Year 10 studies
- Concerns about a perceived discontinuity between junior and senior secondary school studies.

Professor McGaw recommended that the School Certificate be abolished and replaced, for students leaving school, with a statement of achievement which would include each student’s results on statewide tests in literacy and numeracy as well as school-based results in all courses completed in Year 10.

Despite Professor McGaw's recommendations, the New South Wales government remained committed to the School Certificate, though major changes were made to its structure and timing in order to address some of the concerns listed above.

The disparity between the recommendations of the McGaw report and the actions taken by the New South Wales government led to frequent rumours and press reports of the ultimate abolition of the School Certificate. However, the NSW Government remained committed to the School Certificate for several years. In 2010, the New South Wales Government asked the Board of Studies to review the School Certificate as part of the changes to the school leaving age in New South Wales and also the development of a national curriculum. The NSW Government announced the abolition of the School Certificate after 2011, with students in year 10 that year being the final cohort to sit the external examinations and receive the qualification.

== See also ==
- Education in Australia
- School Certificate (UK)
- School Certificate (New Zealand)
- School Certificate (Mauritius)
- School Certificate - Other variants: Zambia, Nigeria
- Higher School Certificate (New South Wales)
- Board of Studies
- NSW Education Standards Authority
