= Queensland Core Skills Test =

The Queensland Core Skills Test, commonly referred to as the QCS Test or simply QCS, was a statewide test formerly completed by all Queensland year twelve students who were eligible for an Overall Position, and was optional (but beneficial) for tertiary entrance rank students. These ranks were used to gain entrance into tertiary degrees and courses. In-school subject rankings given to students were scaled and moderated using the performance of the subject cohort at individual schools on the QCS test. The QCS test was the only statewide external exam conducted in the two senior years of secondary education (Years 11 and 12). The test was held for the final time on 3–4 September 2019, and will be replaced with external examinations as part of the new Queensland Certificate of Education system.

The QCS Test was claimed to be an achievement test grounded in the Year 12 curriculum, rather than a measure of intelligence or aptitude. Moreover, the test was aimed to be accessible to all students regardless of their subject choices, with general knowledge, vocabulary and mathematics tested only to the common Year 10 level. The test was held over two consecutive days late in Term 3.

== Format ==
The QCS Test comprised four papers—a two-hour writing task, a two-hour short response paper, and two one-and-a-half-hour multiple choice tests. These formed the three modes of assessment—extended writing, short response and multiple choice.

The writing task required students to write around 600 words of continuous English prose based on provided stimulus material and a set theme. This could include graphics, quotations and statistics.

The short response paper tested various skills through several numerical and 'verbal' (language-based) questions, including calculations, reading comprehension, reasoning and drawing. The two multiple choice papers required candidates to choose from four alternative answers for a variety of questions.

Results on the QCS test were returned to students as an overall grade from A to E with exit results in December.

== Content tested ==
The test was designed by the Queensland Curriculum & Assessment Authority to test 49 common curricular elements, including basic skills from "recognising letters, words and other symbols" to complex skills such as "hypothesising" and "expounding a viewpoint".

== Previous writing task topics ==
- 2019: What's Next
- 2018: Connection
- 2017: What Lasts
- 2016: Seeing Things
- 2015: What Feeds Us
- 2014: Who Cares?
- 2013: Things Unknown
- 2012: Getting There
- 2011: Gold
- 2010: Flight
- 2009: Time
- 2008: Circle
- 2007: Essence
- 2006: Shape
- 2005: Discovery
- 2004: What Matters
- 2003: Face
- 2002: Space
- 2001: Light
- 2000: Work

== Trivia ==
In 2010, a student-organised movement, fuelled by the popular social networking site Facebook, suggested that students mention Bear Grylls in the writing task or in the short response task, similar to Project Clooney '09 in the General Achievement Test. A similar movement was started in 2011, substituting Harry Potter for Bear Grylls.

In 2018, some students started a movement to rename QCS to 'QCStress'.

== See also ==
- Education in Australia
- Overall Position
- University admission
