= Instituto Cervantes Sydney =

The Instituto Cervantes in Sydney, Australia is a branch of the Instituto Cervantes, the institution created by Spain in 1991.

The Instituto Cervantes in Sydney is also the Spanish Cultural Centre. It was inaugurated by the King and Queen of Spain, together with the Australian Authorities on 25 June 2009.

== DELE ==
The Sydney branch of the Instituto Cervantes is in charge of the DELE "Diplomas of Spanish as a Foreign Language". The DELE is issued by the Instituto Cervantes in Oceania on behalf of the Ministry of Education, Culture and Sport.

Currently they run the exam in Sydney, Canberra, Melbourne and Brisbane in Australia. Also in Auckland, New Zealand and Nouméa, New Caledonia.

The Instituto Cervantes Sydney teaches Spanish language to adults, offering face to face and online Spanish Language course, and children at their centre in 3/299-305 Sussex St, Sydney and in many schools, universities and companies.

The teacher training is also one of the main activities. Some of the teacher's courses are accredited by the Board of Studies, Teaching and Educational Standards (BOSTES).

The Spanish classes for kids are part of the Cervantes Kids program which includes also cultural and sports activities for kids from 3 years old.
