= Thinkswap =

Online educational platform for secondary and tertiary students across Australia

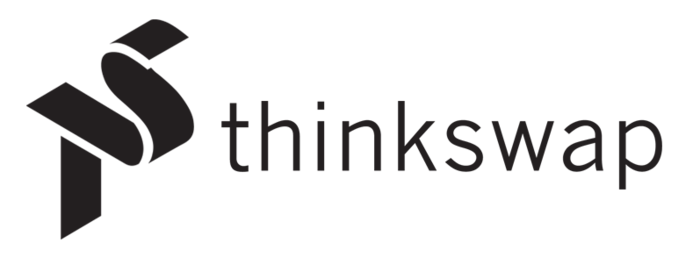
- Founded: 2010
- Founder: Adam Fasullo
- Headquarters: Sydney
- Area served: Australia
- Key people: Andrew Romano, Emmanuel Christophorou, Manjeet Kaur
- Services: Access to study resources, study notes, subject guides, past essays, assignments
- Website: https://thinkswap.com/

Thinkswap is an online educational platform for secondary and tertiary students across Australia that provides access to a variety of study resources, including study notes and subject guides, as well as past essays and assignments. Thinkswap collates and organises all user-submitted material allowing users to search for content by either University (or certificate, in the case of secondary school content), down to the specific subject the user is studying. Users can either upload their own content in exchange for credits which they can "swap" for new content, or purchase content directly.

== History ==
Thinkswap was founded by Adam Fasullo whilst studying at the University of Technology Sydney in 2010 as a means for students to share their own class notes, subject guides and past assignments. He believed that most of this sharing was already occurring amongst group of friends and developed Thinkswap to bring this dynamic online, whereby students would benefit from multiple information sources. Following the full website launch, friends Andrew Romano and Emmanuel Christophorou later joined the company as Directors. The website initially targeted University students in NSW, but it has grown since then and now has coverage across most universities in each State across Australia. In late 2014, Thinkswap extended its reach to High School students in NSW and is continuing to expand into other states across Australia. In 2015 and 2016, the website made its first physical presence appearing at the NSW HSC and Careers Expo.

== Features ==
=== Exchange Credits ===
Exchange credits form the currency of the Thinkswap marketplace. In exchange for uploading a document, users will receive a certain number of exchange credits that can be used to purchase other documents on Thinkswap. Alternatively, exchange credits can be purchased directly giving the user access to the resource instantly. Through the use of Exchange Credits, Thinkswap essentially standardises the value of all uploaded documents, broadly classifying resources as either: Complete Study Notes, Partial Study Notes, or Past Essay / Assignment. In essence, a user uploading content of a certain value will be able to ‘swap’ it for another document of equal value.

== Controversy ==
Whilst Thinkswap reviews all uploaded content, there is no ability to guarantee that the content is the original work of the uploading user. This is particularly the case for past essays / assignments, as well as subject guides, which may contain some copyright material of the University or school. In order to protect the intellectual property of the original author, Thinkswap is required by law to expeditiously remove content when it is flagged as infringing copyright.

Given Thinkswap also accepts past essays and assignments, the website has been criticised in the media as an aid of student cheating. In response to this, Thinkswap has taken proactive steps to ensure users are aware of the correct use of the platform, including promoting numerous messages around plagiarism and the website's intention to fully co-operate with universities in any cases of student cheating suspected to relate to Thinkswap content.
