= Board of Studies, Teaching and Educational Standards =

NSW government education board 2014–2016

Board of Studies, Teaching and Educational Standards (BOSTES)

Government agency overview
- Formed: 1 January 2014
- Preceding agencies: Board of Studies; NSW Institute of Teachers
- Dissolved: 31 December 2016
- Superseding Government agency: NSW Education Standards Authority
- Jurisdiction: New South Wales, Australia
- Status: Dissolved
- Headquarters: 117 Clarence Street, Sydney, New South Wales; 33°52′01″S 151°12′18″E
- Government agency executive: Tom Alegounarias, President
- Parent Federal government agency: Australian Curriculum, Assessment and Reporting Authority
- Website: bostes.nsw.edu.au

The Board of Studies, Teaching and Educational Standards NSW (abbreviated as BOSTES) was the state government education agency in New South Wales, Australia. It was formed on 1 January 2014 following the amalgamation of the Board of Studies and the NSW Institute of Teachers, and replaced on 1 January 2017 by the New South Wales Education Standards Authority.

BOSTES was responsible for:

- the accreditation of all teachers at all levels
- the endorsement of teachers’ professional learning
- the accreditation of initial teacher education degrees
- establishing professional teaching standards.
- curriculum from kindergarten to initial teacher education
- examinations (including the NSW Higher School Certificate (HSC) and the AMEB NSW)
- the registration of non-government schools and home schooling
- the regulation of school providers of courses to overseas students

BOSTES was also accredited by the Australian Curriculum, Assessment and Reporting Authority as the NSW test administration authority for NAPLAN.

BOSTES was responsible for awarding the secondary school credentials Record of School Achievement and HSC.
