= Queensland state schools =

Queensland state schools are government-funded primary schools throughout Queensland, Australia that provide universal free education from Prep to Year 6 (Primary schools). Queensland state schools are funded by the Department of Education. In some rural communities, state schools can provide education up to year 10, roughly until students are 16 years old.

Queensland state high schools, or Queensland public high schools, are Queensland Government-run secondary schools (or high schools) that are part of the Australian education system.

== State education system ==
Queensland has an extensive state education system, which are free to attend and open to all residents, funded by the Queensland Government Department of Education. Although the basic education of the students is free, fees may be levied for extra goods and services such as text books, school photos and magazines. In cases of financial hardship, it is often possible to have additional fees waived or subsidised by the government or by community donations. All students in Australia are legally required to study at a registered institution until they are 16 years old, normally until they finish year 10.

The system consists of primary schools (see below), high schools, special schools (catering to the needs of those with physical and intellectual handicaps severe enough to preclude mainstreaming) and the Correspondence/Remote support service.

The Queensland system of State Schools grew out of the National Schools program, the first of which in Queensland was established in 1850 in Warwick, funded by the Government of New South Wales. Other national schools such as that at Drayton soon followed. After Queensland was declared independent of New South Wales in 1859, it assumed responsibility for Schools. In 1870, State Schools became free, and with the Education Act of 1875, provided for free and compulsory education in State schools for all Queenslanders.

In 2013, around 250 public schools have registered as independent public schools, giving them greater autonomy on how they operate.

== Discipline ==
In April 2013, Queensland education minister John-Paul Langbroek announced that school principals will be given the right to send unruly students to Saturday detention, in a bid to reduce bad behaviour across Queensland's state schools.

== Primary schools ==
Primary schools tend to be more numerous and smaller than high schools in the Queensland State education system. Primary schools rely strongly on the support and fundraising of their Parents and Citizens (P&C) Associations.

Primary schools in the Queensland education system are normally named Suburb/Locality/Town/District State School. Unlike some other schooling systems, state schools in Queensland are normally not (re)named to commemorate significant individuals or historic events.

== High schools ==
The schools cater for students from Year 7 to Year 12 (or some smaller range within this).

=== Naming of schools ===
Secondary schools in the Education Queensland system are normally named Town/District State High School, and often referred to by their acronym e.g. TSHS. Unlike some other schooling systems, State High Schools in Queensland are normally not (re)named to commemorate significant individuals or historic events. A few schools (e.g. Bundamba State Secondary College) have adopted other styles of names. Some schools have been renamed from Town SHS to District SHS, this sometimes occurs when smaller schools in a district are closed, and rural school bus services to the major centre provided instead.

=== Variations ===
In some rural areas, small local State High Schools cater only to years 8 to 10, with students continuing to Year 12 busing to a larger centre for their final two years. There have also been a few schools, usually in extremely remote areas, that provide Years 1 to 10 (Hightop Primary Schools), with those wishing to complete Senior usually moving to a larger centre to complete their schooling.

A very small number of State High Schools offer or have offered either dormitories or out-boarding placements, however the majority of boarding schools in Queensland are religiously affiliated, mostly Anglican, Lutheran or Catholic schools.

In recent years, some new schools have been built with a clear division between the Junior (years 8 & 9) and Senior (years 10–12) facilities, with the Junior sub-campus referred to as the Middle School.

=== Completion ===
The Queensland Certificate of Education is a certificate of completion given to students at the end of Year 12. It is considered a minimum qualification for most employment. A certificate was historically given at the conclusion of grade 10, known as the Junior Certificate, while the final certificate received at the conclusion of grade 12 was the Senior Certificate. It is now Queensland Government policy that student must remain in education, training, or work, until they are 17. This requirement has become known as the earning or learning policy.

Under the previous system, apprenticeships and other post (junior) secondary employment and training options, coupled with compulsory attendance only until age 15 saw many students leave to enter the workforce before completing the Junior Certificate. Changes to employment conditions, compulsory education requirements and other factors have seen most students now completing junior and attending through to senior certificate level. Now all students must achieve either a Queensland Certificate of Education or be working full-time.

This system has only recently been applied and so the last group of Year 12s to receive the traditional Senior Certificate were those who graduated at the end of 2007. Following this year all students receive a Senior Statement, showing all subjects and results achieved and eligible students will also receive a Queensland Certificate of Education. Students can keep working towards their QCE for up to nine years.

== See also ==
- Education in Australia
- History of state education in Queensland
- List of schools in Queensland
