= Overall Position =

Former tertiary entrance rank issued to students in Queensland, Australia

The Overall Position (OP) was a tertiary entrance rank used in Queensland, Australia to guide selection into universities. Like similar systems used throughout the rest of Australia, the OP shows how well a student has performed in their senior secondary studies compared with all other OP-eligible students in Queensland. The system was introduced in 1992 and ended with the 2019 cohort.

The OP is calculated and used similarly to the Australian Tertiary Admission Rank (ATAR) in other states. Instead of being a percentile rank (0.00 - 99.95), however, OPs are measured on a scale from 1 to 25, where 1 is the highest and 25 is the lowest. This range of possible results is bell curved so the percentage of students receiving the very highest and very lowest results is much less common than those receiving mid-range OPs. In 2018, 733 students received an OP1, according to Minister for Education Grace Grace. 49.7% of Queensland high school students were eligible to obtain an OP in 2018.

A table is produced in conjunction with other tertiary authorities to allow conversion between Overall Position, ATAR, Universities Admission Index, SAT, and the A-Level scales.

From 2020, the OP rank was replaced with the ATAR, bringing Queensland in-line with all other Australian states and territories.

== Calculating an Overall Position ==
OPs are calculated by the Queensland Curriculum and Assessment Authority (QCAA) for all students who satisfactorily complete the Queensland Certificate of Education (QCE) (or equivalent) and who meet certain other criteria for receiving an OP, such as participating in the Queensland Core Skills (QCS) Test and completing at least 20 semesters of Authority subjects through Year 11 and Year 12. A landmark feature of this system is that all assessment is set and marked internally within schools, subject to QCAA approval. As such, calculations are necessary to ensure that students are being equally assessed in ability in the school across subjects, and from school to school. Two levels of scaling are applied to ensure that each subject the student sits contributes equally to their OP.

=== Assignment of SAIs ===
When a student exits (completes or drops out of) a subject, they will have amassed a portfolio of assessment they completed in that subject. Summative assessment pieces completed in Year 12 are then used to assign each student a Level of Achievement (LOA) for each subject they complete, as determined by the grades they received on those assessment pieces. There are 5 LOAs which range from Very High Achievement (VHA) to Very Low Achievement (VLA), and are often further fine-grained with a rating from 1 to 10 inside each LOA, called a rung. Students are then ranked by their teachers in comparison to all other OP-eligible students in that subject using their LOAs and rungs and will assign Subject Achievement Indicators (SAIs) in moderate (10-13 students) and large (over 13 students) subject groups. SAIs range from 400 to 200, with the best student always assigned 400 and the bottom student always assigned 200, and all other students assigned an SAI in between. The gaps between SAIs reflect the gaps between student achievements.

=== Within-school scaling ===
The SAIs for each subject group are forwarded to the QCAA to check and then scale. The first stage of scaling is within-school scaling, where the QCAA multiplies all SAIs by an adjusted QCS mean. The Queensland Core Skills (QCS) Test is the sole standardised test administered to all Queensland secondary school students under the same conditions, and as such is the sole measure by which students across the state can be compared. Within-school scaling is required because while all subjects assign SAIs of 400, a student with an SAI of 400 in Mathematics C may not be achieving the same standard as a student with an SAI of 400 in Drama at the same school, and a student with an SAI of 400 in Mathematics A at one school may not be achieving at the same standard as a student with an SAI of 400 in Mathematics A at a different school. Within-school scaling attempts to equate all subjects within a school so that SAIs are comparable within schools. As each subject group has its own SAI distribution, each subject group is scaled according to the adjusted average of its students QCS results. The new SAIs for each subject are called scaled SAIs and range from 75 to 275. Scaled SAIs are comparable between subjects within a school and a student's best 5 scaled SAIs are then averaged to form that student's Overall Achievement Indicator (OAI).

=== Inter-school scaling ===
While OAIs are comparable within a school, an OAI of 200 at one school is not comparable to an OAI of 200 at a different school. Because of this, a second stage of scaling is required. Inter-school scaling multiplies a school's OAIs by that school's adjusted QCS mean. This produces a scaled OAI for each student that is comparable throughout Queensland.

=== Assignment of OPs ===
As scaled OAIs are comparable between all schools in the state, students can be ranked in a statewide rank order using them. From this, students are grouped into OP bands and assigned an OP from 1 to 25.

== Percentiles ==
The OP distribution is based on a bell curve and as such it can be difficult to determine the percentages of students who receive certain OPs. From year to year, the percentages of students who receive certain OPs is around the same. This table lists OP percentages from 2018.

OP Band	% in band	Cumulative
1	2.83%	2.83%
2	4.09%	6.92%
3	4.69%	11.61%
5	5.12%	21.78%
7	6.30%	33.75%
10	6.62%	53.96%
15	5.21%	82.68%
20	1.64%	98.50%
25	0.00%	100.00%

== Field Positions ==
Field Positions (FPs) are given supplementary to a student's OP. While OPs measure a student's overall achievement, FPs measure achievement with relation to certain "Fields", or areas of the curriculum. FPs are measured on a scale of 1 to 10, with 1 being the best and 10 being the worst. The calculation of FPs is very similar to the calculation of OPs.

Field	Descriptor
A	Extended written expression involving complex analysis and synthesis of ideas
B	Short written communication involving reading, comprehension and expression in English or a foreign language
C	Basic numeracy involving simple calculations, and graphical and tabular interpretation
D	Solving complex problems involving mathematical symbols and abstractions
E	Substantial practical performance involving physical or creative arts or expressive skills

Different subjects contribute different amounts to different Fields. For example, Mathematics C contributes 20 "weighted semesters" to Field D, but only 4 weighted semesters to Field A, while English contributes 20 weighted semesters to Field A, but none to Field D. A student is eligible for an FP in a certain Field if they complete 60 weighted semesters, and will only receive FPs for Fields they are eligible in. When determining tertiary admission, only certain FPs are considered depending on what the subject matter in a degree is. For example, a Maths degree may only consider Fields C and D, while an Arts degree may consider Fields A, B and E.

== New QCE System ==
Students who entered Year 11 in 2019 were assessed under the new QCE system, which involves assigning Australian Tertiary Admission Ranks (ATARs) instead of OPs. This change aligned Queensland's tertiary ranking system with those of other Australian states and territories. The new system includes an external subject-specific exam which forms part of individual student's assessment.

== See also ==
- Queensland Tertiary Admissions Centre
- Equivalent National Tertiary Entrance Rank
- University admission
- Tertiary Entrance Rank
