= Senior External Examination =

The Senior External Examination is an annually held Queensland examination, serving as a pathway to tertiary study for students who have been away from studies for a long period of time, who left school before attaining their Queensland Certificate of Education (QCE) or had performed poor in their studies and need to improve their selection rank for university. In addition, high-school students can follow the examination to partake in subjects not offered by their schools (such as Korean), but they will usually have to find private tuition. Senior External Examination is recognized by the Queensland Studies Authority (QSA) and the Queensland Tertiary Admissions Centre (QTAC) who together govern high-school subjects and tertiary admission for Queensland.

The Senior External Examination is essentially a condensed form of formal year 10, 11 and 12, allowing those eligible to take the examination for credit toward their QCE. The QCE can be awarded on the basis of only the examination if students complete enough subjects.

In distinguishing formal education from the Senior External Examination, the examination does not grant students an overall position (OP) - it uses their results to confer a selection rank only. OPs are generally preferable to university admission as they test not only academic performance but also their performance relative to the school. In 2019, the new system Atar replaced the OPI system for the class of 2020. The first external exams in Queensland will be held at the end of the year. Due to Covid, each year 12 student will have one less assessment for each subject.

== Workload ==
The subject requirements vary depending on student circumstances. For example, a student who has had no formal year 10, 11 & 12 education or did not complete the final year of high-school must complete 3-5 subjects, determined by age. It is decided by each of the tertiary institutes' how many subjects are to be studied to be accepted.

Technically, the Senior External Examination is not an educational program but an assessment. There are schools designed for it but enrollment is not compulsory to be eligible. There is no governing of who teaches subjects, and students may have to find private tutors for most of the subject syllabi. Senior External Examination programs are typically done over the course of a year. In fact, many of the subjects available are not taught at registered schools (such as Modern Greek and Geography) but students may opt for these subjects and learn them by self-directed study or private tutoring.

== Availability ==
The Senior External Examination is available to adult students who wish to contribute to their QCE. If adults have completed secondary studies without a QCE (e.g. by not completing enough units of study) they can take an examination in the following year, but they're also available to students who have not completed year 10, 11 & 12. In fact, they have no requirements but most education providers expect the knowledge of a year 10 student.

== Subjects offered ==
The Senior External Examination offers the following 22 subjects.

- Accounting
- Ancient History
- Arabic
- Biology
- Chemistry
- Chinese
- Drama
- English
- Geography
- Korean
- Legal Studies
- Mathematics A
- Mathematics B
- Modern Greek
- Modern History
- Philosophy & Reason
- Physics
- Polish
- Russian
- Spanish
- Vietnamese
- Visual Art

There are no examinations for Mathematics C which was a prerequisite for Engineering at many tertiary courses prior to 2010. The Mathematics C prerequisite however has been dropped by most institutions.

== Training providers ==
Training for the Senior External Examination is non-compulsory. There exist four state schools and one private.

== Alternatives ==
There are alternative pathways to university than the Senior External Examination. Students may also choose to undertake formal, internal schooling at a high-school, complete enough TAFE courses to be awarded the certificate of education, follow a subject's bridging course or a year of a lower ranked course (typically arts) at a university in the case a certificate of education has been obtained already.

High-schools generally take two years to complete to gain the certificate of education, and are oriented toward teens. There is no such adult high-school equivalent to attaining the certificate in Queensland, though there are in other states, e.g. New South Wales. It may be an option for adults to return to study at a normal secondary school, but there are difficulties with being accepted due to age differences. Many schools frown at adults being on school grounds.

Technical and Further Education (TAFE) also serves as an alternative pathway to university. There are specialized courses for this, including the Adult Tertiary Preparation IV course (ATP) which aims to develop skills in literacy, numeracy and study skills as core components. This does not follow the year 10/11/12 syllabus, but is independent of it. TAFE subjects generally take longer to complete if they are done entirely for the QCE. It is inadvisable however to use TAFE as a pathway without completing year 12 or equivalent, as many institutions have prerequisites of year 12 studies. It is not possible to gain a Senior Certificate from ATP, however tertiary providers may enrol students with this educational background as they are granted a selection rank for their studies. This can also be taken by school leavers to prepare after a period of being away from study. Since the Senior External Examination is merely an examination and not a full-time study commitment, it may be possible to do both at one time, thereby gaining more credit.

Completion of a year at a university grants another set of selection ranks, allowing for students to receive higher selection rank based on the performance in those studies. It is possible for students to undertake tertiary study in a less competitive program (e.g., arts) and transfer to a more competitive program with the new rank.

== See also ==
- Education in Australia
