= Coalition for College =

American college application organization

- Nickname: The Coalition
- Formation: 2015; 11 years ago
- Type: Nonprofit
- Products: Coalition Application
- Key people: Liz Cheron (CEO)
- Website: coalitionforcollegeaccess.org
- Formerly called: Coalition for Access, Affordability, and Success

The Coalition for College, formerly the Coalition for Access, Affordability, and Success (CAAS), is an American nonprofit organization that runs the Coalition Application, a U.S. college application platform. It was founded in 2015, aiming to provide a holistic application that assists disadvantaged students. Its main competitor is the more widely used Common Application.

== History ==
The Coalition launched with 83 member schools in 2016, which were required to meet a set of criteria for selectivity and access. 56 institutions used it in its first year.To be a member, schools have to meet certain graduation requirements across demographic, along with other criteria.

As of 2019, approximately 150 institutions offered it.

== Application process ==
Students can apply via the Coalition Application, which is available for over 150 member schools, located on Coalition for College's website. A variety of application fee waivers can be utilized in order to make applying for college accessible to students.

== Reception ==
Some higher education experts were intrigued or excited by the application's launch. Others questioned whether it will truly help improve college access.

In 2019, Inside Higher Ed reported widespread complaints that the application was difficult to fill out.

As of 2023, the Coalition Application partnered with Scoir, Inc to make finding and filling out the application much easier for students.

=== Scoir Inc. lawsuit ===
In August 2025, a class action lawsuit was filed in the U.S. District Court of Massachusetts against 32 universities; also named among the defendants were the Consortium on Financing Higher Education, along with the Common Application and Scoir Inc., two platforms used by the schools. The lawsuit alleges the universities “openly participated and are participating in practices that entrench patterns of inequality of access while inflating the price of attendance" and names the organization and platforms as part of an "early decision conspiracy".In October, the three groups involved moved to dismiss the students' antitrust claims.

== See also ==
- Common Application
- College admissions in the United States
- Transfer admissions in the United States
- Universities and Colleges Admissions Service (UCAS), UK
