= New South Wales Education Standards Authority =

NSW government education agency

NSW Education Standards Authority (NESA)
- Logo of the NSW Education Standards Authority

Statutory authority overview
- Formed: 1 January 2017
- Preceding Statutory authority: Board of Studies, Teaching and Educational Standards (BOSTES)
- Jurisdiction: New South Wales, Australia
- Headquarters: 117 Clarence Street, Sydney, New South Wales; 33°52′01″S 151°12′18″E
- Employees: 280
- Annual budget: A$122 million
- Minister responsible: Prue Car, Minister for Education and Early Learning
- Statutory authority executives: Peter Shergold, Chair; Paul Martin, Chief Executive Officer
- Website: educationstandards.nsw.edu.au

The New South Wales Education Standards Authority (abbreviated as NESA) is the state government education statutory authority with the responsibility for the establishment and monitoring of school standards in the Australian state of New South Wales. It was formed on 1 January 2017 to replace the Board of Studies, Teaching and Educational Standards,

NESA is also accredited by the Australian Curriculum, Assessment and Reporting Authority as the NSW test administration authority for NAPLAN.

NESA is responsible for awarding the secondary school credentials Record of School Achievement and Higher School Certificate.

== The NESA Board ==
The current chair is Professor Peter Shergold AC.

== See also ==
- List of New South Wales government agencies
- Education in Australia
