= Common App =

Undergraduate college admission application

Common Application Inc.
- Formation: 1975; 51 years ago
- Type: Non-profit NGO
- Legal status: Public charity
- Purpose: Higher-education application processing
- Headquarters: Arlington, Virginia, United States
- President & CEO: Jenny Rickard
- Website: www.commonapp.org

The Common Application (more commonly known as the Common App) is an undergraduate college admission application that applicants may use to apply to over 1,000 member colleges and universities in all 50 U.S. states and the District of Columbia, as well as in Canada, China, Japan, and many other European, Middle Eastern, and Asian countries.

Member colleges and universities that accept the Common App are made up of over 250 public universities, 12 historically black colleges and universities, and over 400 institutions that do not require an application fee. It is managed by the staff of a not-for-profit membership association (The Common Application, Inc.) and governed by a 18-member volunteer Board of Directors drawn from the ranks of college admission deans and secondary school college counselors.

== History ==
The platform evolved from an effort to centralize college admission and was founded in 1975 with 15 initial members in the northeast. The goal was to increase access to higher education by simplifying the application process through connecting various stakeholders involved in college admissions.

The first online application was launched in 1998 and has led to increased and more diverse applications. In 2000, public schools were allowed to join for the first time, although private schools are more likely to be members. The Common Application has been found to reduce overall time costs of the college admissions process while increasing overall application volume. Colleges often receive an up to 25 percent increase of applications after joining the Common Application and a boost of out of state students.

In 2021, Common Application launched a direct admissions program to provide students offers without formally applying as an effort to increase confidence and diversity.

== Digital application system ==
There are different Common Applications for first-year admission and transfer admission. The application is filled out once online and can be submitted to all schools of the applicant's choosing, with the same information going to different schools. Some schools require supplemental materials, such as essays, that are specific to that school.

== Competition ==
The Coalition Application was created by a consortium of 80 colleges and universities known as the Coalition for Access, Affordability, and Success, in September 2015. By 2019, the organization was renamed the Coalition for College; that year around 150 universities participated. The Coalition application was created in an attempt to facilitate a holistic process of application, and includes "lockers" where students can create a portfolio starting in 9th grade.

The Common Black College Application (CBCA) was started in 1998 to facilitate the process of applying to Historically Black Colleges and Universities (HBCU).

== See also ==
- Coalition for College
- College admissions in the United States
- Transfer admissions in the United States
- Universities and Colleges Admissions Service (UCAS), UK
