= University and college admission =

Process through which students enter tertiary education

University admission or college admission is the process through which students enter tertiary education at universities and colleges. Systems vary widely from country to country, and sometimes from institution to institution.

In many countries, prospective university students apply for admission during their last year of high school or community college. In some countries, there are independent organizations or government agencies to centralize the administration of standardized admission exams and the processing of applications.

== Armenia ==
Admission to the Armenian state institutions of higher education is centralized. Students apply to universities during their last year of high school. The standardized university admission tests are administered every summer right before the start of the new academic year starting each September. Currently, there are 26 registered State and private universities in Armenia. Admission to private universities is dependent upon the policies of each private institution.

== Australia ==
As Australia uses a Federal system of government, responsibility for education, and admission to Technical and Further Education colleges and undergraduate degrees at universities for domestic students, are in the domain of state and territory government (see Education in Australia). All states except Tasmania have centralised processing units for admission to undergraduate degrees for citizens of Australia and New Zealand, and for Australian permanent residents; however, applications for international and postgraduate students are usually accepted by individual universities. The Australian government operates the Higher Education Contribution Scheme (This has been replaced by the very similar HECS-HELP - Higher Education Loan Program) for undergraduate students, so admission is rarely limited by prospective students' ability to pay up-front. All states use a system that awards the recipient with an ATAR, and the award of an International Baccalaureate meets the minimum requirements for admission in every state. ATARs are awarded based on the level of attainment in each State's individual secondary schooling exams (such as the NSW HSC). For individuals without an ATAR, or recent secondary schooling certificate, the Special Tertiary Admissions Test is used as the standard test to provide an ATAR. The maximum possible ATAR rank is 99.95, based on a 2000-point ranked scale.

=== New South Wales and Australian Capital Territory ===
The Universities Admissions Centre (UAC) processes applications for admission to most undergraduate courses at participating institutions, mainly in NSW and the ACT.

It also:

- processes applications for admission to many postgraduate courses
- calculates the Australian Tertiary Admission Rank (ATAR) and notifies NSW HSC students of their ATAR
- administers tertiary admissions tests, such as the Special Tertiary Admissions Test (STAT)
- processes applications for Educational Access Schemes (EAS) and for some Equity Scholarships.

=== Northern Territory ===
The South Australian Tertiary Admissions Centre (SATAC) accepts applications for Northern Territory tertiary institutions. Year 12 students are awarded the Northern Territory Certificate of Education and must meet course requirements.

=== Queensland ===
The Queensland Tertiary Admissions Centre (QTAC) accepts applications for Queensland tertiary institutions. Year 12 students are awarded an Overall Position, based on their performance in class subjects and their school's average result in the Queensland Core Skills Test, as well as meeting course requirements.

=== South Australia ===
The South Australian Tertiary Admissions Centre (SATAC) accepts applications for South Australian tertiary institutions. Year 12 students are awarded the South Australian Certificate of Education, and must meet course requirements. Their year 12 results are compared with students from the same year to determine their Australian Tertiary Admission Rank.

=== Tasmania ===
Tasmanian school leavers applying for entrance at the University of Tasmania need to apply directly to the university. Tasmanian school students receive a Tertiary Entrance Rank on successful completion of the Tasmanian Certificate of Education. Students wishing to study at the University of Tasmania must directly apply through the university.

=== Victoria ===
The Victorian Tertiary Admissions Centre (VTAC) accepts applications for Victorian tertiary institutions. Applications consist of standardised test results and meeting institutional requirements. The standard certification for school leavers is the Victorian Certificate of Education.

=== Western Australia ===
The Tertiary Institutions Service Centre (TISC) accepts applications for Western Australian tertiary institutions. The standardised test for school leavers is the Tertiary Entrance Examination.

== Austria, Switzerland, and Belgium ==
Austria, Switzerland, and Belgium have a comparatively open system of university admission, where anyone with a Matura or equivalent qualification may enroll in most subjects at public universities. In Belgium as well, the only prerequisite for enrolling in university studies is to have obtained a high-school diploma. In both Switzerland and Belgium, medical studies are an exception, which have a numerus clausus system due to overcrowding. This open admission system has resulted in higher enrollment rates in popular fields of study such as psychology and journalism, which has coincided with higher dropout rates in these areas.. Following a ruling by the European Court of Justice issued on July 7, 2005, which forces Austria to accept nationals of other EU Member States under the same conditions as students who took their Matura in Austria, a law was passed on June 8 allowing universities to impose measures to select students in those fields which are subject to numerus clausus in Germany. Starting in 2006, the three medical universities (in Vienna, Innsbruck and Graz) did introduce entrance exams. There are no intentions to introduce a numerus clausus in any subject field.

== Brazil ==
In Brazil, the most common selection process happens via the ENEM - Exame Nacional do Ensino Médio (National High School Exam). Annually designed for high school seniors and open to people of any age, it allows people with a high school certificate to enter public and private universities. There are also different types of entrance exams in public and private universities, since not every higher education institution accepts the ENEM score. Around 3 to 8 million people register each year to take the exam.

=== Vestibular ===
In order to enter university in Brazil, candidates must undergo a public open examination called "Vestibular", which lasts about 1 week and takes place once a year. Some universities may run Vestibular twice a year, for two yearly intakes instead of only one. This option is popular with private universities, while public universities usually run Vestibular only once every year (in November, December or January). Universities offer a limited number of places, and the best-ranked candidates according to their overall Vestibular grade are selected for admission. Although the Vestibular format changes from university to university, it typically consists of a week-long examination on compulsory high school subjects such as mathematics, physics, chemistry, biology, history, geography, Portuguese language and literature, and a foreign language (usually English). Private universities usually "condense" this week-long examination into a couple of days, but some public universities still require a week-long marathon.

In Brazil, public universities are tuition-free, leading to high levels of competition for limited spots, especially in popular programs. Due to the high number of applicants, the Vestibular at some public universities may include a preliminary elimination phase (known as "Primeira Fase"), typically consisting of multiple-choice questions and held between one and two months before the subject exams. A minimum cutoff score is normally required at the elimination phase to advance to the second part of the Vestibular.

=== National Unified Admissions System ===
In recent years, university admission criteria have been considerably changed by the introduction by the federal government of a new national secondary school exam known as ENEM (Exame Nacional do Ensino Médio) and the creation of a unified, national university application system known as SISU (Sistema de Seleção Unificada). Candidates in any Brazilian state can now apply for admission into courses available in the SISU system, even if the course of interest is offered by an out-of-state university. Places in any given course within the system are then filled based on the ranking of the applicants in descending order according to their overall grade in the ENEM. The application process is divided into three stages and candidates who fail to get a place in their course/university of interest in a given stage may re-apply either to the same or to a different course/university in subsequent stages.

In theory, any Brazilian university, either public or private, is free to join the SISU system and select their incoming freshman class based on ENEM marks. As of today, most public universities have joined SISU, but a few of them, most notably some of the most prestigious federal universities (e.g. UNIFESP, UFRJ, UFMG, UFRGS) have retained their own independent Vestibular exams, on top of the national ENEM, either for admission into all or part of their undergraduate courses.

Sometimes the ENEM replaces the old elimination Part I ("primeira fase") of the Vestibular. Alternatively, ENEM results may be used as part of the final overall grade in the Vestibular. More rarely, a few public universities have decided not to use ENEM grades at all and continue to base their admission criteria on the Vestibular only. Notable examples in the latter group include the highly prestigious federal military schools like ITA and IME. Some public universities have opted to retain their independent Vestibular exams, citing concerns about the comparative selectiveness and rigor of the national federal ENEM exam.

=== Admission quotas ===
Another important recent development in university admissions in Brazil has been the introduction in most public universities of a quota system in which a certain number of places is reserved a priori to applicants of a certain racial/ethnic background who have completed their pre-university studies in a public (i.e. state-funded) school. Candidates who qualify may apply to a course of interest under the quota system either through the national SISU system or directly at their university of choice (in case that university uses both its independent Vestibular and the national ENEM exam to select applicants). Also, a few universities, such as UNICAMP, have instituted a Vestibular for indigenous applicants that studied in public secondary schools, thus boosting their chances of securing a place in college.

== Canada ==
=== Post-secondary preparation ===
There are a number of factors affecting a successful transition from high school to post-secondary institutions which should be taken into account when planning programs and interventions to assist students with the move from high school. Student affairs professionals in Canada support high school students in the transition to post-secondary institutions through a wide variety of services and programs. High school guidance counsellors and student affairs practitioners work together to provide information, programs, and workshops to high school students such as program prerequisites, post-secondary admission and application requirements, scholarship opportunities and application processes. Specific information and services related to the application and admissions process for post-secondary institutions in Canada are managed provincially. For example, in Ontario, post-secondary program information is provided through the Ontario College Application Service (OCAS) and Ontario University Application Centre (OUAC).

=== Undergraduate entry ===
In Canada, students applying from high school generally hear back from a college or university between late March and late May, though offers of admission may be extended to high achievers (through GPA or other submissions) as early as November–January. International/US applicants are likely to receive an offer or rejection by early April, depending on the original submission of documents. In some cases, an institution may offer admission in a high schooler's Grade 11 year, if monetary fees are sent in early.

==== Dual admission ====
Many Canadian universities offer dual admission (admission to both the university and a partnered institution, such as a college) to students upon completion of their graduation requirements.

For example, grade 11 and 12 students at Columbia International College can apply for dual admission at Canadian universities such as York University, University of Alberta, Brock University and Cape Breton University.

==== College vs. university ====
Acceptance to a Canadian university or college often requires completion of a high school diploma (or equivalent). Some colleges or universities accept applicants based on other outcomes, such as the General Educational Development test, age and life experience, admissions testing, or other criteria.

In Canada, the difference between college and university is significantly different from the typical interpretation in the United States or even the United Kingdom. A Canadian college is more similar to an American community college. In contrast, a Canadian university is comparable to an American university, and virtually all Canadian universities have endowments over $20 million, most frequently above $100 million. Almost all Canadian post-secondary institutions are publicly funded (that is, government-subsidized). The few private institutions that are not government-supported are not widely known at all, have generally only been established since the 1980s, and are mostly located in British Columbia.

In the Canadian education system, which varies from province to province, colleges are geared toward individuals seeking more specific technical careers, such as graphic design or animation whereas universities are geared to individuals seeking more academic careers where a university degree is a prerequisite for entrance, such as medicine or law. There are other systems in place for students to enter traditional trades (called "skilled trades" in Canada), and some provinces have unique preparatory systems or schools, such as Quebec's pre-university college level.

==== Admissions requirements ====
Admission to colleges and universities in Canada has been a direct process since the 1970s. Students generally rank their chosen institutions in order of preference and submit their transcripts to the institution or provincial application service for evaluation. In the majority of cases, acceptance is based entirely on marks, with potential for elevation depending on what province an applicant may be from. In some Canadian provinces, students applying to in-province universities may face slightly lower grade requirements compared to out-of-province applicants. For instance, a student applying from an Ontario high school to a university in Alberta or Quebec is likely to require marginally elevated grades as opposed to applying to any school in Ontario itself, where universities and colleges may have lower requirements for their own province's high school graduates.

In most cases, Canadian universities require students' high school transcript along with an application for admission. Applications for admission outline additional academic and extracurricular achievements that cannot be expressed through a student's transcript. Generally, universities require that students have taken a university-prep grade 12 English course. Additionally, programs involving mathematics and/or natural science often require students to take a university-prep grade 12 calculus course, as well as university-prep grade 12 biology, chemistry, and physics. Overall, universities base admission around a pupil's academic performance in university/advanced level courses in their grade 11 and 12 years. Also, most universities establish GPA cut-offs for admission. This cut-off is established based on the competitiveness of individual programs at specific universities. A more competitive program could have a cut-off average of 90 percent or higher, while most prestigious programs maintain cut-offs around 80 percent. Universities with more liberal application processes could have admission cut-offs as low as 65 percent.

==== College ====
College requirements vary more significantly, though none have entrance requirements above 85 percent from a Canadian high school. In general, though, many colleges (such as George Brown College, and Mohawk College) accept a very high proportion of students with averages above 70 percent, although they may place no limiting minimum for acceptance, and consequently take students with averages below 60 percent. Unlike universities, colleges do not have admission cut-offs and as long as students have a passing average and the necessary courses, they can gain admission to most colleges. Incidentally, even the newest Canadian universities have larger endowments than any Canadian college, with no Canadian college having an endowment above $10 million. See List of Canadian universities by endowment.

In addition, many education systems in Canada have established different courses with varying intensity in order to curtail a pupil's desired future. Ontario has gone the furthest with this idea, establishing two different streams in its secondary education system. The university stream includes courses that will prepare students for future studies at university, while the college stream is more applied and less intense, preparing individuals for the future pursuit of a college degree. Universities require these advanced courses for admission, while colleges will admit pupils from either stream.

==== Special cases ====
Students with an IB Diploma can generally enter either college or university more easily than other Canadian high schoolers, due to the material covered in the program. Like students with AP credits, they may also clip courses in university with faculty consent.

In the case of more select university programs, and for almost all international students, an essay, statement of intent or personal statement of experience must be submitted directly to the faculty being applied for. Additionally, letters of reference, examples of extracurricular involvement, additional community service endeavours, athletic participation, awards and scholarships won and more may all be required for acceptance to some of Canada's top programs.

==== Comparability of admissions ====
There is an array of highly competitive programs within Canadian institutions, on par with some mid to top-tier programs in the United States. Institutions like the University of Toronto, the University of British Columbia, and McGill University find themselves ranked among the world's top universities. In addition, a large portion (upwards of 30%) of university graduates in Canada continue to pursue further education beyond an undergraduate degree.

=== Post-graduate entry ===
Post-graduate schools in Canada are, as with other parts of the world, restricted to universities (i.e. One cannot get a master's degree from a Canadian college). Admission to any post-graduate program in Canada is difficult, with many universities having world-renowned programs, and Canadian graduate schools being the sites for many famous inventions and discoveries.

=== See also ===
- Ontario Universities' Application Centre (Ontario)
- Ontario College Application Service (Ontario).
- List of colleges in Canada
- List of universities in Canada
- Association of Universities and Colleges of Canada
- List of Canadian universities by endowment

== Chile ==
In Chile university admission as a freshman is based on the Prueba de Selección Universitaria, PSU, scores and ranking of the applicant. Chilean Traditional Universities tend to put a strong emphasis on Prueba de Selección Universitaria while the majority of the private universities use their own test or handle PSU scores in a different way than the Chilean Traditional Universities. Architecture, theatre, psychology and some medical schools do also often give high value to special tests.

== China ==
In the People's Republic of China, the National College Entrance Examination (高考, gaokao) is given each summer and required for each student. The exam covers common school topics such as math, language, history, science, etc. Better institutions require higher scores for admittance. The required score also varies by province: students in more competitive provinces, like Jiangsu, need higher scores than students from less competitive areas such as Tibet. Conversely, wealthier cities have more universities per capita and hence lower university entrance standards than some poorer provinces such as Anhui. In 2006 for example, the minimum score to enter a key university for applicants from Beijing is 516 but the minimum score for applicants from Henan is 591.

A popular trend in recent years is for students to forfeit the National College Entrance Examination for Western education programs in order to better prepare them for admission into US universities.

== Finland ==
For Finland, see Numerus clausus in Finland

Some fields of study explicitly encourage applicants to judge their chances realistically. For example, a student may apply to only one medical school per year. Therefore, choosing to apply to the more competitive medical schools is risky, if the student is not sure about their strength.

For universities of technology, there is a similar, but less strict mechanism. The students gain extra priority points, which may increase their points for the first choice by up to 12.5%. A student who is admitted to several programs cannot accept any other than the one with the highest priority.

== Germany ==
In Germany, prospective students who have passed the Abitur may decide freely what subjects to enroll in. Recently, however, in some of the most popular and most desired subject fields students have to pass a certain numerus clausus — that is, they cannot enroll unless they have scored a minimum grade point average on their Abitur.

There are two types of higher education institutions in Germany, the universities (including Technische Hochschulen) and the Fachhochschulen (polytechnics). A prospective student who has passed the Abitur is qualified for admission to every German university, with the exception of very few new degree programs, for which additional entrance examinations were recently introduced. A Fachhochschule, in contrast, often requires the student to complete an internship to qualify for admission.

There is also a second German school leaving exam, which qualifies prospective students for admission to higher education in Germany, the Fachhochschulreife, often called Fachabitur in colloquial usage. An internship is already part of the Fachhochschulreife itself, therefore a Fachhochschule requires no additional internship from the student. However, most universities do not accept this qualification for admission. An exception is universities in the German state of Hesse, which accepted this qualification in 2004 for admission to bachelor's degree courses, but not to the traditional German Diplom degree courses. But with a Fachhochschulreife (university of Applied Sciences entrance qualification) you can visit any Fachhochschule (university of Applied Sciences) in Germany. You can see the difference between a university / Technische Hochschule and a Fachoberschule very quickly: A Fachhochschule has often the words "University of Applied Science" next to its name.

== Greece ==
Admission to Higher Education in Greece is based on the system of entrance examinations, namely the Panhellenic Examinations, which are set one-time every year by the Ministry of Education. In order to be eligible for the entrance examinations, applicants must be upper secondary school (high school) graduates and hold an Upper Secondary School-leaving Certificate either from a lyceum, a technical high school or another equivalent recognised private upper secondary school. In Greece, the government's upper secondary school-leaving certificate is an Apolytirio Lyceum. Admission to Higher Education institutions depends on the entrance examinations achievement score (grades) attained on chosen subjects on a written basis, based on the grades of upper secondary school-leaving or technical high school certificate; number of available places (numerus clausus) and on the candidates' ranked preferences among the higher education schools/ departments.

== Hong Kong ==
All public universities in Hong Kong admit local students under the Joint University Programmes Admissions System (JUPAS).

=== In the old system HKALE ===
The major criterion of selection is HKALE result, and to a smaller extent HKCEE result and interview performance.

=== In the new system HKDSE ===
The major criterion of selection is HKDSE result. To a smaller extent interview performances and to an even smaller extent secondary school performances.

== Iceland ==
Both public and private universities in Iceland handle their own admissions. Students apply for a specific course of study and each programme has its own requirements. These are usually a matriculation exam but sometimes a minimum number of credits in certain subjects in gymnasium or even passing an entry test is needed. Foreign students must apply half a year prior to the first semester but the time limit for Nordic citizens is not as strict.

== India ==
Most Indian universities participate in one or another centralized admission procedure. No weight is given to applicants' past or recent academic record and their admission is based on their ranking in the entrance exam. Applicants are ranked by their entrance exam marks, and submit their preference of universities/programs based on their rank and choice. These exams mostly required expensive coaching which poor and rural students cannot afford, and leads to some disadvantages for students without coaching, for example, only 1.6% cleared NEET in Tamil Nadu without expensive coaching. Some such common entrance tests are:

- Joint Entrance Examination – Main (JEE-Main) – Standard means of entry to the National Institutes of Technology, Indian Institutes of Information Technology, Other Centrally Funded Technical Institutions (CFTIs), Institutions/Universities funded/recognized by participating State Governments.
- Joint Entrance Examination – Advanced (JEE-Advanced) – Standard exams for entry to the Indian Institutes of Technology.
- Common Law Admission Test (CLAT) – Standard means of entry to the National Law Universities across India.
- National Eligibility cum Entrance Test (Undergraduate) (NEET (UG)) – For entry into undergraduate medical education MBBS, The test is conducted at all Indian level.
- Common University Entrance Test (CUET) – For admission to Central Government Universities and selected state universities.
- University Course Examination – For of the academic year, University Examination Authority, conduct examinations twice like Semester Examination & Annual Examination.

== Indonesia ==
In Indonesia, university and college admission is dependent on the university or college status. Generally, public universities conduct their admission in the unified system of two as of 2019. Public nationwide admissions to public universities are subsidies by the government and students who succeed in entering university from one of the two schemes will enjoy lower to free university program fees. The first alternative is SNMPTN (Seleksi Nasional Masuk Perguruan Tinggi Negeri-Unified National Public Universities Admission). SNMPTN is a university admission scheme based on academic performance during the years of senior high school. This selection system is designed only for students graduating during that respective year only. SNMPTN selection considers a few criteria such as student's academic grades and performances, achievements, stream or type of class (science or social, AP or Regular) and originating high school. However, not all senior students can apply, usually only 50% of the graduating class may apply for an 'A' accredited school and lower quotas for other accreditations. According to the law of the Ministry of Higher Education, the total holding admission into a public university should at least be 30% of SNMPTN; each university may allocate more. The second alternative is SBMPTN (Seleksi Bersama Masuk Perguruan Tinggi Negeri-Unified Public Universities Admission Examination).

SBMPTN is a university admission where applicants take two or three tests (aptitude test, natural science test, and/or social science test); applicants will also be required to submit to a practical session if the chosen major is art, music, or physical education. You also choose 3 different majors and/or universities. This examination is held nationwide once a year and unlike SNMPTN, is open to high school graduates of the last 3 years. But in 2019, there are changes whether you take one or two tests first held by LTMPT (State University Admission Test Agency) and then submit their scores to register on SBMPTN. Also since 2019, there have been no practical sessions if the chosen major is art, music, or physical education, which is replaced by submitting a portfolio. Many students repeat or take gap years to retake the SBMPTN to get into their desired university. According to the Ministry of Higher Education, a minimum of 40% of the entire public university quota should be admitted from SBMPTN. However, most public universities allocate 60% and above for SBMPTN due to the constantly high success rate of students who were accepted from this scheme. The SBMPTN exam includes complex questions and requires effective time management, making it a challenging process for many applicants. The exam is also held CBT (Computer-Based) starting last year.

Most universities are conducting independent selection mechanism on their own beside SNMPTN and SBMPTN to fulfill remaining quotas such as SIMAK or PPKB from Universitas Indonesia or UTUL from Universitas Gadjah Mada (UGM). These are called special programs as they tend to be more expensive due to the incentive that these programs are not under government subsidies. Meanwhile, Private Universities usually do their admission before and after Public Universities Admission. They sometimes do several admissions. Governmental Agency Institutions does their admission independently (not included in Unified National Public Universities Admission) and will usually have their own scheme for selection.

== Iran ==
In Iran, admission is highly competitive and only top students may achieve this honor. Undergraduate and graduate prospective students are admitted at the Iranian public universities on the basis of their GPA and the National University Entrance Exam result. International students can apply directly to admission office of each university but should take Standard Persian Language Proficiency Test, 'SAMFA Test' to show their Persian language proficiency. The SAMFA Persian language test serving by National Organization for Educational Testing (SANJESH Organization) and Centre for International Scientific Cooperation (CISC) of the Iranian Ministry of Science, Research and Technology (MSRT)

The Iranian University Entrance Exam, simply known as Konkour (Persian: کنکور; from the French Concours), is a standardized test used as one of the means to gain admission to higher education in Iran for Iranians. Generally, to get a Ph.D. in non-medical majors, there are three exams, all of them called Konkour.

== Ireland ==
In Ireland, students in their final year of secondary education apply to the Central Applications Office, listing several courses at any of the third-level institutions in order of preference. Students then receive points based on their Leaving Certificate, and places on courses are offered to those who applied who received the highest points.

== Israel ==
In Israel there is a test called The Psychometric Entrance Test (PET). The PET covers three areas: mathematics, verbal reasoning and the English language. It is administered by the Israeli National Institute for Testing and Evaluation (NITE). University admissions are typically based on a weighted average (the "mit'am") of the PET score and the GPA of the Bagrut (High School Completion Examination). In addition, some programs in science and engineering require that the applicant's bagrut includes the maximum number of units ("5 units") for mathematics.

Some programs have two cutoffs for the mit'am, a higher one for "guaranteed admission" and a lower one for "automatic rejection". Mit'am scores between the two cutoffs may be admitted on a space-available basis.

== Japan ==
In Japan, there are at least three methods for controlling university admissions: the AO method (involving recommendation letters for students who have performed reasonably well and have shown commitment and skill in relation to sports or other extracurricular activities), a centralised multiple choice examination known as the Common Test for University Admissions, and entrance examinations set by each of the universities. A combination of methods may also be used. For public universities, the Center Test is often used as an initial filtering stage to determine eligibility to take the more difficult examinations set by each individual university. Public national universities usually require candidates to sit examinations across a wide range of subjects, whilst private ones allow a focus on arts and humanities or sciences, reducing the burden of preparation. However, public national universities are popular due to prestige and lower fees, although some private universities are more prestigious than certain public national universities. There is usually no limit on the number of colleges to which a student may apply but public national universities tend to hold their examinations on one of two days, which means that students must in practice choose two preferred public national universities and also correctly estimate their own ability to avoid picking a university examination that is too difficult or that is too easy. To assist with this, private companies run a number of mock examinations throughout the year, enabling candidates to gauge where they rank in comparison to other candidates nationwide. Based on this they will decide which examinations they should realistically be able to attempt. Reforms are to be implemented to the Center examination in future, with extended answer questions being introduced in addition to multiple choice questions, and with official internationally recognised standardised tests in English being used to replace individual university exams in English.

== Malta ==
In Malta entrance is done after performing well in examinations which are a local version equivalent to the General Certificate of Education.

== Netherlands ==
In the Netherlands, university admission in fact begins at the admission to a secondary school type at the end of primary school. The teacher of the student gives a so-called advice, or advies, advising the child to apply for a school type. A standardized test is taken to aid in this process. The three school types are VMBO (voorbereidend middelbaar beroepsonderwijs, i.e. peraratory middle vocational education), HAVO (hoger algemeen voortgezet onderwijs, i.e. higher general secondary education), and VWO (voorbereidend wetenschappelijk onderwijs, i.e. preparatory scientific education). VMBO grants access to vocational education and does not give access to university, though after finishing, it is possible to continue into HAVO and then VWO in order to gain access to a given course. HAVO gives access to universities of applied sciences, or polytechnics (hogeschool), while VWO gives access to research universities (the only universities properly called universiteit in Dutch).

Two years before graduating from VWO (the student will be around 16), prospective students have to choose a graduation type (specialising in humanities, economics, health sciences, or natural sciences). Courses at Dutch universities accept all students who have chosen the correct graduation type (e.g. to enroll in physics, the graduation type 'natural sciences' is required). All other students have to pass an exam to be enrolled (this is the exception). Popular subjects, such as medicine or dental medicine have a numerus fixus, meaning that a limited number of students may enroll for this subject at a particular university. To decide who is allowed, a lottery is held in which ones grades influence chances of being chosen (an indirect and incomplete numerus clausus). Most humanities courses allow students of all graduation types to enroll freely and do not employ these selection methods.

== Nigeria ==
In Nigeria, undergraduate admissions into universities, polytechnics, monotechnics, and colleges of education and agriculture is administered by a centralized federal government agency known as the Joint Admissions and Matriculation Board, JAMB. The body conducts Unified Tertiary Matriculation Examination (UTME) for prospective university, polytechnics, monotechnics, and colleges of education and agriculture students seeking entrance into tertiary institutions in Nigeria. Students who obtain the minimum cut-off mark of 180 in the JAMB_UME are invited by their institution of choice for a second entrance examination called the Post-UTME aptitude test which is conducted by individual tertiary institutions.

== Norway ==
In Norway candidates are admitted to entry-level programs through the Norwegian Universities and Colleges Admission Service, that ranks qualified students based on a point scheme, that is based on grades and the degree of specialization and choice of study at upper secondary school, as well as age. At Master level admission is based on the grade average at the Bachelor level.

== Pakistan ==
In Pakistan, public and private universities hold entrance tests for admission in undergraduate and postgraduate degrees either conducted by the university itself or by NTS. The Quota System in Pakistan is also used to give preference to students from backward areas.

For admission in engineering and medical degrees, ECAT and MDCAT are taken respectively. The appearance in these exams is mandatory for every student to pursue his degree in these disciplines in public sector universities.

== Palestine ==
In Palestine there is a National Center for Examinations and Evaluation. Students are required to undergo the Tawjihi examinations, which then allow the universities in the West Bank to consider each candidate.

== Portugal ==
In Portugal admission to higher education level studies requires the secondary school credential, Diploma de Ensino Secundário, which is achieved after completing the first twelve study years. Students must have studied the subjects for which they are entering to be prepared for the entrance exams. Also they are required to be previously specialised in a specific area at the secondary school, one of the following four: Science and Technologies, Economics, Humanities or Arts. Students sit for one or more entrance exams, Concurso nacional for public institutions or Concurso local for private institutions. In addition to passing entrance exams, students must fulfil particular prerequisites for the chosen course. Enrollment is limited; each year the institution establishes the number of places available. For the public institutions the exam scores count for the final evaluation, which includes the secondary school average marks. Then the students have to choose six institutions/courses they prefer to attend, in preferential order. The ones, who reach the marks needed to attend the desired institution/course, given the attributed vacant, will be admitted. Some public university courses demands generally higher admission marks than most similar courses at some polytechnical institutes or private institutions. (see also Education in Portugal)

== Russia ==
Traditionally, the universities and institutes conducted their own admissions tests regardless of the applicants' school record. There were no uniform measure of graduates' abilities; marks issued by high schools were perceived as incompatible due to grading variances between schools and regions. In 2003 the Ministry of Education launched the Unified state examination (USE) program. The set of standardized tests for high school graduates, issued uniformly throughout the country and rated independent of the student's schoolmasters, akin to North American SAT, was supposed to replace entrance exams to state universities. Thus, the reformers reasoned, the USE will empower talented graduates from remote locations to compete for admissions at the universities of their choice, at the same time eliminating admission-related bribery, then estimated at 1 billion US dollars annually. In 2003, 858 university and college workers were indicted for bribery, admission "fee" in MGIMO allegedly reached 30,000 US dollars.

University heads, notably Moscow State University rector Viktor Sadovnichiy, resisted the novelty, arguing that their schools cannot survive without charging the applicants with their own entrance hurdles. Nevertheless, the legislators enacted USE in February 2007. In 2008 it was mandatory for the students and optional for the universities; it is fully mandatory since 2009. A few higher education establishments are still allowed to introduce their own entrance tests in addition to USE scoring; such tests must be publicized in advance.(see also Education in Russia)

== Saudi Arabia ==
Admission to colleges in Saudi Arabia depends on the high school grade as well as the scores of some standardized tests called Qiyas Tests prepared by the National Center for Assessment in Higher Education.

== South Korea ==
Korea uses a nationally standardized exam called the College Scholastic Ability Test (su-neung) as the primary factor for undergraduate admissions. Many students in Korea begin preparing for the College Scholastic Ability Test (CSAT) during middle school and continue throughout high school, reflecting its importance in the admissions process.

== Sweden ==
Admission in Sweden requires completion of secondary education, along with the proper specific qualifications (e.g. science in high school to study science in college). Prospective students are admitted based on their grade point average or SAT, although majors such as theatre and architecture may require some extra work.

== Thailand ==
At present, Thai university admissions are done through the "Thai University Central Admission System" or TCAS, a central admissions system developed by the Council of University Presidents of Thailand (CUPT). This system is divided into four rounds of admissions: portfolio admissions, quota admissions, joint admissions, and direct admissions.

=== Round 1: Portfolio admissions ===
Universities accepting students in this round have a lot of freedom in setting admission requirements but generally look at the extracurricular activities and achievements of a student, so a portfolio containing the student's basic information along with their extracurricular activities and achievements is expected by most universities. However, some programmes (especially international programmes) will also accept and use international standardised examinations in consideration such as the SAT, IELTS, BMAT, etc. After the recently announced changes that will be implemented in 2023, universities will now accept aptitude tests developed by CUPT which include the TGAT and TPAT exams.

=== Round 2: Quota admissions ===
This round of admissions is intended to provide more opportunities in education for students in areas outside of Bangkok, the capital. This round is similar to round 1 in that programmes accepting students in this round have freedom in setting their requirements. However, scores such as the TGAT, TPAT, and General Subject Tests are usually required.

=== Round 3: Joint admissions ===
In this round, universities accept students with exam scores of TGAT, TPAT, and General subject tests. Round 3 admissions are handled by the CUPT rather than the universities. After taking the exams and receiving their results, students will list up to 10 universities they want to apply for, with the top being the first choice and the bottom, the last resort. Though admissions of all higher education programmes in round 3 is done through the same system by using scores from the same set of exams, each programme has different criteria and weights given to each exam and in the case of programmes such as medicine, engineering, and many others, TPAT scores corresponding to the field in which that programme is will be used in the admissions process. For example, medical schools under COTMES will require TPAT 1 (Medical Aptitude) and 7 General Subject Tests (Physics, Chemistry, Biology, Mathematics, English, Thai, Social Studies) while engineering schools generally require TGAT, TPAT 3 (Engineering Aptitude), Physics General Subject Test, and sometimes, Chemistry and Biology General Subject Tests.

=== Round 4: Direct admissions ===
In round 4, universities have total freedom in setting their requirements and criteria. Universities can require scores in TGAT, TPAT, General subject tests, or other exams such as the SAT, and IELTS. They can also require the student's portfolio and set requirements of the student's region of origin.

=== Admissions exams ===
The Thai Aptitude Tests and General Subject Tests are exams used in the Thai University Central Admissions System. These exams include the TGAT, five TPAT exams, and nine General Subject Tests. These exams are expected to be conducted via computer-based tests at various TCAS test centres. Scores of the aptitude tests will be required by some universities accepting students through the first, second, and fourth round of TCAS and required by all universities accepting through the third round. While the scores of the General Subject Tests will be used in the second, third, and fourth round of TCAS.

==== Thai General Aptitude Test ====
The Thai General Aptitude Test or TGAT (replacing GAT in 2023) is an aptitude test aimed to test the basic or general abilities of a student such as English communication, and logical thinking. It also tests how fit the student is in becoming a future worker in Thai society.

The TGAT is divided into three sections:

- English communication
- Critical and Logical Thinking
- Future workforce competencies
  - Value Creation & Innovation
  - Complex Problem Solving
  - Emotional Governance
  - Civic Engagement

==== Thai Professional Aptitude Tests ====
The Thai Professional Aptitude Tests or TPAT (replacing PAT in 2023) are aptitude tests required by universities for students applying for programmes in any of the five fields: medicine; liberal arts; science, technology, and engineering; architecture; and education. Students may choose to take the tests that are required by the programme they are applying to.

- TPAT 1: Medical Aptitude Test (developed by the consortium of Thai medical schools, COTMES). TPAT 1 is divided into three sections:
  - Section 1: Thinking skills and Aptitude
  - Section 2: Ethics
  - Section 3: Reading analysis and synthesis
- TPAT 2: Liberal arts Aptitude Test. TPAT 2 tests candidates' knowledge in the visual art, music theory, performance arts.
- TPAT 3: Scientific, technological, and engineering Aptitude Test. TPAT 3 tests candidates' ability in Physics and Chemistry as well as their ability to apply their knowledge. The test is completely objective, consisting of multiple choices and student-produced response.
- TPAT 4: Architecture Aptitude Test. TPAT 4 tests candidate's ability in non-numerical Physics and aptitude in basic arts and design. There are questions that ask students to design a room with furnitures given. These questions are completely objective and are scored by computer. The test contains a subjective section, testing candidates' ability to sketch and draw.
- TPAT 5: Teaching and educational Aptitude Test.

==== General Subject Tests ====
While the TGAT and TPAT test the aptitude or innate ability to comprehend and understand something, the General Subject Tests are intended to test a student's knowledge of each subject and his/her ability to apply that knowledge. The General Subject Tests include:

- Thai
- Social studies
- English
- Other foreign languages (replacing PAT 7 in 2023)
  - French
  - German
  - Japanese
  - Chinese
  - Arabic
  - Pal
  - Korean
- Applied science
- Applied mathematics which includes two optional sections: basic and advanced
- Biology
- Chemistry
- Physics

The students are responsible to report all scores to the central admission system. They are required to choose a program or faculty that they want to study in. After that, different mathematical formula is used to weighed students' scores for that program. For instance, Pharmacology requires high scores on Sciences, while Economics requires high score in Mathematics. After the score is weighed, students are offered decision only according to their scores.

== Turkey ==
In Turkey, the Student Selection and Placement Center ÖSYM is the responsible body for organizing YKS, the national level university admission examination. For international student candidates, universities require YÖS exam score for admission to graduate courses.

== United Kingdom ==
In the United Kingdom there are separate admission processes for undergraduate and postgraduate degrees. There is also The Open University which has an open door policy.

=== Undergraduate entry ===
==== The application process ====
The United Kingdom has a centralised system of admissions to higher education at undergraduate level, UCAS. In general, students are not admitted to universities and colleges as a whole, but to particular courses of study.

During the first few months (September to December) of the final year of school or sixth form college (age 17/18) or after having left school, applicants register on the UCAS website and select five courses at higher education institutes (fewer choices are permitted for the more competitive subjects such as medicine and veterinary medicine). Applicants still at school receive predicted grades for their A-level by their teachers, Highers or IB subjects, which are then used for the application. Applicant who already left school applies with results already obtained. Applicants must provide a personal statement describing in their own words why they want to study that particular subject and why they would be a committed student, and their school must provide an academic reference. Some universities (e.g. Oxford, Cambridge, Manchester, Imperial College, King's College London or University College London) and some disciplines (e.g. medicine) routinely require shortlisted candidates to attend an interview and/or complete special admissions tests before deciding whether to make an offer. In the absence of tests and interviews, the personal statement and reference can be decisive, as many students are likely to apply to competitive courses with similar predicted and actual grades.

In general, applications must be received mid-January for courses that start the following Autumn. However the deadline is three months earlier, in mid-October, where the application includes a medical, dentistry or veterinary course, or any course at Oxbridge.

For each course applied for, the applicant receives a response from the institution: rejection, conditional offer or unconditional offer. If a conditional offer is received, the student can only take up the place on the course if they later fulfil the stated conditions: normally the achievement of specific grades in their forthcoming exams. If no offers are received following the initial application, or the applicant does not wish to take up any of their offers, UCAS+ can be used. Applicants can then apply to one course at a time in order to try to find a suitable offer.

Following the receipt of offers, whether after the initial application, or through UCAS+, the applicant chooses two courses for which offers have been made: a first choice and a second choice. If the conditions of the first choice offer are later met, the applicant may attend this course. If the applicant does not fulfil the conditions of their first choice, but does fulfil the conditions of their second "insurance" choice, they can attend their second choice course. If they fail to meet the conditions of both offers, they may choose to go through "clearing". This involves ringing up or sending their application to different universities in the hope of finding a place on another course. Many students do successfully find places through this route.

==== Factors affecting admission ====
Whether to admit an applicant to a course is entirely the decision of each individual university. They will base their decision on a variety of factors, but primarily the grades predicted or already received in school leaver examinations. As more and more applicants are attaining higher and higher grades in the A level examinations, most universities also use secondary admissions criteria. These may include results at GCSE or Standard grade examinations (or equivalent), the references provided on the application and the information provided on the personal statement. The personal statement can often be the deciding factor between two similar candidates so a small industry has sprung up offering false personal statements for a fee. UCAS employs similarity detection software to identify personal statements that closely resemble pre-existing sources or third-party-written content, which may lead to application rejection.

The personal statements generally describe why the applicant wants to study the subject they have applied for, what makes them suitable to study that subject, what makes them suitable to study at degree level generally, any work experience they have gained, their extracurricular activities and any other factors. This is the only way admissions tutors can normally get an impression of what a candidate is really like and assess the applicant's commitment to the subject.

In addition to the information provided on the UCAS form, some universities ask candidates to attend an interview. Oxford and Cambridge almost always interview applicants, unless, based on the UCAS form and/or admissions tests, they do not believe the applicant has any chance of admission. Other universities may choose to interview, though only in some subjects and on a much smaller scale, having already filtered out the majority of candidates. The interview gives the admissions tutors another chance to assess the candidate's suitability for the course.

There has been an effort by the central government to encourage universities to broaden access to students from diverse social backgrounds. Social background can only be assessed by the type of school attended, as no information about income or background is otherwise required on the UCAS form.

Another important determinant of whether an offer is to be made is the amount of competition for admission to that course. The more competitive the course, the less likely an offer will be made and, therefore, the stronger the application must be. Applicants for medicine are often expected to have undertaken extensive work experience in a relevant field in order to show their commitment to the course. For the most competitive courses, less than 10% of applications may result in admission, whereas at the less competitive universities, practically all applicants may receive an offer of admission.

Ultimately, however, no matter how many extra-curricular activities and work experience have been undertaken, if the admissions tutor does not believe, based on the submitted exam results, the candidate is academically capable of completing the course, he or she will not be admitted.

A well qualified candidate applying under UCAS for five competitive courses to each of which only 10% of well qualified candidates could be accepted would have only a 40% chance of receiving at least one offer of acceptance. Alternatively, if five less competitive courses each having a 33% acceptance rate are chosen, the chance of receiving at least one offer is more than 85%. This implies that a strategy for improving the chance of receiving at least one offer, to perhaps 70%, is indicated even to well qualified candidates. It is notable that in order to get admitted in a university in the United Kingdom, admission tests are not universally identified as the most important as the main factors that determine a college admission. Surveys indicate that strong performance in school examinations, such as GCSEs, is a significant factor in university admissions.

=== Postgraduate entry ===
All applications are made directly to the university or college, with no limit on the number of courses that can be applied for.

== United States ==
In the United States, high school students apply to four-year colleges and universities, where undergraduate students may earn a bachelor's degree. Others attend community colleges or a two-year institution. These students may acquire a technical degree, a two-year associate degree, and/or prepare for transfer to four-year institutions. Nontraditional students are usually students over the age of 22 who pursue higher education. Students may apply to many institutions using the Common Application. Fees are generally charged for each application but can be waived based on financial need.

Students apply to one or more colleges by submitting an application which each college evaluates using its own criteria. The college then decides whether or not to extend an offer of admission (and possibly financial aid) to the student. The majority of colleges admit students to the college as a whole, and not to a particular academic major, although this may not be the case in some specialized programs such as engineering and architecture.

Common criteria include ACT or SAT scores, extracurricular activities, GPA, demonstrated integrity, and an application essay. Further criteria, used to varying degrees, include athletic ability, interest the student demonstrates in the college, legacy preferences (family members having attended the school), race, ability to pay full tuition, potential to donate money to the school (development case), desired class composition, perceived fit, subjective evaluation of student character (based on essays or interviews), and general discretion by the admissions office. The importance of these factors varies between universities, and selectiveness varies significantly, as measured by admissions rate. The admissions rate can range from 100% (schools that accept everyone with a high school diploma) to under 10%.

== Vietnam ==
In Vietnam, most students apply to study in four-year colleges, universities, or academies after completing high school. Others apply to two- or three-year colleges, where they have options to transfer to a university once earned their degree, or to vocational schools. While the number of students applying to two- or three-year colleges and vocational colleges are increasing, especially the latter in recent years thanks to government's efforts, the number is still insignificant.

Preparation for college and university admissions usually do not begin until the last year of high school. Students will usually attend university fairs and career counselling sessions, organised jointly by Ho Chi Minh Communist Youth League and local governments. Representatives from both national and local colleges and universities will travel in troupe to organise booth and answer questions from students. These activities are in session throughout the school year, though different locales have different day when these activities are organised. This usually means that students in provinces most distant from major educational centres, such as Ho Chi Minh City and Hanoi, will attend these fairs and sessions last.

College and university admissions are mostly a centralised affair, coordinated by the Ministry of Education and Training (MoET). In particular, MoET works closely with colleges and institutions to determine admission quotas, taking into account of predicted market demands and instructional capability and shares information about the National High School Examination result (see below). In addition, the MoET regulates the list of admitted students, as reported from colleges and universities, to reduce inflated "candidates bubble" since students can register and be potentially accepted to many institutions at the same time.

In Vietnam, students are admitted to a particular programme, not an institution as a whole. And within any programme, colleges and universities usually offer many pathways that students can choose to apply for admissions. One common and predominant pathway is by using results of different subject combination from the National Higher School Examination. Not until recently, that schools move to diversify their admission pathways, for instance, opting for high school records or accepting international qualifications in lieu or in addition to Vietnamese ones to evaluate students admissibility. Some colleges and universities set additional requirements, especially in specialised fields such as medicine.

While there exists many subject combinations and admission pathways, this is not synonymous to a comprehensive evaluation. Colleges and universities treat applicants from each subject combinations and admission pathways as different and discreet pools. This means that students interested in one particular programme from one particular school can be admitted in, for example, four ways: two subject combinations, for example A (mathematics, physics, chemistry) and A1 (mathematics, physics, English); and two admission pathways such as using high school records and using international qualifications.

In addition, grades and academic performances are still the sole criteria for evaluation, regardless of means of admissions. Results from the national exam still play an important role, even students opt for alternative admission pathways that do not use them, as the exam is foremost a benchmark assessment to whether students can graduate from high school or not.

=== National High School Exam ===
The National High School Exam (Kỳ thi Trung học Phổ thông Quốc gia) serves both as a graduation exam and an admission exam. Colleges and universities in Vietnam use the results from this exam as the most common and the most predominant pathway to evaluate their applicants' admissibility. Results of the exam are organised into different subject combinations, fitting with the nature of the programme.

Commonly used subject combinations include:

- Subject combination A, including mathematics, physics, chemistry.
- Subject combination A1, including mathematics, physics, English.
- Subject combination B, including mathematics, chemistry, biology.
- Subject combination C, including Vietnamese literature, history, geography.
- Subject combination D, including Vietnamese literature, mathematics, foreign language.

There are other subject combinations as well, especially for fields such as fine arts, music, kindergarten and primary school education, and physical education. Newer combinations are instated by colleges and universities as they are now given more freedom to determine their admission pathways and subject combinations.

==== Registration ====
Students register to write the exam in March or April. Because of high dependency on the national exam, they also rank their programme choices in their application form, as well as the pathways they wish to be considered for evaluation for admission. This is different from the North American but similar to the British or European admission methods. There is no limit on the number of programme students can choose and rank, but most limit themselves to five or less. Students can change their programme choices and subject combinations during this period by rewriting and resubmitting their application form. Students must pay application fees, which are proportional to the number of choices they made.

==== Examination ====
Students sit for the exam in June or July. There are three compulsory papers to write: Vietnamese Literature, Mathematics, and Foreign Language (primarily English but there are also options in Chinese, Japanese, French, German, Russian and more recently, Korean). Students then have to choose either to write a social science paper (which includes history, geography, and civics) or natural science paper (which includes physics, chemistry, and biology). Except Vietnamese Literature, all remaining papers are multiple-choice.

Exams are set in multiple days with time and date uniformed across Vietnam. In 2020 and 2021, due to COVID-19 pandemic, the exams have been organised into two sessions to accommodate local public health situations.

==== Results ====
Results are graded and released in August or September. They are also shared and open for access to all colleges and universities that use the results. Students, after their results, can also opt for remarks by submitting a petition, or change their programme choices and results combination so they can yield a better chance to get admitted.

== See also ==
- Admissions essay
- College admissions in the United States
- College application
- Educational consultant
- Need-blind admission
- Open admissions
- Open-door academic policy
- Statement of purpose
- Transfer admissions in the United States
