= Board of Studies =

Former education board in New South Wales

Board of Studies NSW
- Abbreviation: BOS
- Successor: Board of Studies, Teaching and Educational Standards
- Formation: 1990
- Dissolved: 2013
- Type: Government agency
- Headquarters: Sydney, New South Wales, Australia
- Location: 117 Clarence Street, Sydney
- Coordinates: 33.867039°S 151.204965°E
- Region served: New South Wales, Australia
- President: Tom Alegounarias
- Chief Executive: Carol Taylor
- Budget: $110 million
- Staff: 210
- Website: boardofstudies.nsw.edu.au

The Board of Studies was the state government education board in New South Wales, Australia from 1990 to 2013. It provided educational leadership by developing the curriculum from Kindergarten to Year 12 and awarding the secondary school credentials Record of School Achievement and Higher School Certificate.

The Board of Studies amalgamated with the NSW Institute of Teachers on 1 January 2014 to form the Board of Studies, Teaching and Educational Standards NSW (BOSTES).

== Presidents of the Board of Studies ==
- Tom Alegounarias (2009–2013)
- Gordon Stanley (1998–2008)
- Sam Weller (1994–1997) (died 2019)
- John Lambert (1990–1994) (died 2014)

== See also ==
- Victorian Curriculum and Assessment Authority
