= College application =

Request to join an educational program

College application is the process by which individuals apply to gain entry into a college or university. Although specific details vary by country and institution, applications generally require basic background information of the applicant, such as family background, and academic or qualifying exam details such as grade point average in secondary school and standardized testing scores.

== United Kingdom ==
Almost all British universities are members of UCAS, a clearing house for undergraduate admissions. Applicants submit a single application for up to 5 courses at different universities. There is a maximum limit of 4 choices for medicine, dentistry and veterinary science courses.

The application also includes current and expected qualifications, employment, criminal history, a personal statement, and a reference (which generally includes predicted grades if the applicant is still in education).

Additional forms are required for application to Oxbridge. One can only apply to a particular college at Oxford or Cambridge in a single year. Many Oxbridge applicants are assessed through academic interviews and sometimes further testing.

== United States ==
=== Undergraduate programs ===
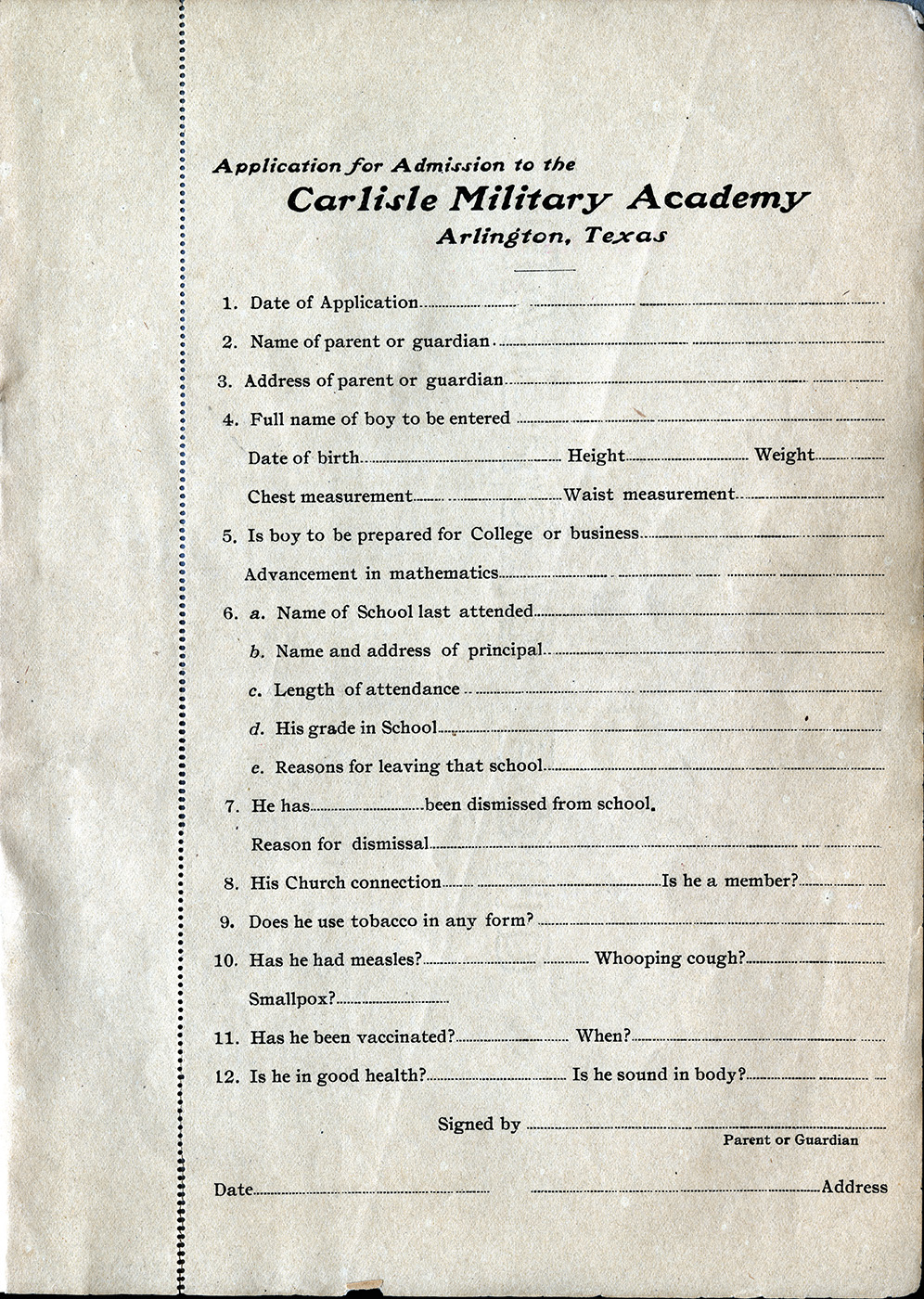
Application for Admission form from Carlisle Military Academy, circa 1904-1905.

Most colleges and universities in the U.S. have their own set of requirements for the information that is necessary for a college application. A common requirement on a college application is the applicant's standardized test scores, most commonly the ACT or SAT, and a high school transcript. Some colleges also require applications to include a Letter of Recommendation and a personal essay. A commonly accepted application used by many universities is the "Common Application," which is an online application that is used by over 500 undergraduate colleges and universities. (See more about "graduate" degree programs below.) Deadlines for admission applications are established and published by each college or university. Many college-bound students receive application assistance and advice from their high school guidance counselors. Students who are transferring from a community college to a four-year college can obtain guidance from their college counselors.

Aided by marketing firms, some colleges send out "fast-track" applications. These applications typically waive the application fee, do not require essays, and assure an admittance decision within a shortened amount of time. Critics warn that these types of applications are misleading, because they give the impression that the student is pre-approved to be admitted and may not explore other colleges because this easy option is provided to them.

=== Graduate programs ===
A substantial number of graduate programs in the United States (5,500+) have centralized their applications for admission to masters and doctoral programs by program discipline. These are commonly referred to as Centralized Application Service(s) or CASs and function somewhat similar to the Common Application for undergraduate programs. Graduate school applicants are able to submit their credentials for consideration to several colleges, universities, schools and programs from a single application.
