= Special Tertiary Admissions Test =

The Special Tertiary Admissions Test (STAT) is a group of four scholastic aptitude tests used for admission into undergraduate programs at Australian universities, for students without a recent Australian Tertiary Admission Rank (ATAR). Some universities require STAT testing for admission to particular programs or courses. The Australian Council for Educational Research designs the examinations. The central tertiary admissions centre in each Australian state and territory and the University of Tasmania administer the STAT examinations.

The STAT assesses core competencies in critical thinking and reasoning, rather than knowledge. Four types of STAT are in use:

- STAT Multiple Choice: The standard test used by tertiary admissions centres. This two-hour examination has 70 questions, half of which test verbal (humanities and social science) competencies and half test quantitative (mathematical and scientific) competencies.
- STAT F: Some universities use this test to determine eligibility for specific courses. This examination is also two hours with 70 questions, half verbal and half quantitative.
- STAT Written English: Some tertiary admissions centres and universities use this one-hour test of the candidate's competence in written English, in addition to either the STAT Multiple Choice or the STAT F. Some universities require this examination for applicants from other countries.
- STAT UCL: This involves 40 critical reasoning and 40 quantitative reasoning multiple choice questions to be completed in 130 minutes. It is taken specifically by applicants to study Computer Science at University College London, a university in the UK.

STAT results are expressed as a numerical score from 100 to 200, 200 being a perfect score. The score indicates the candidate's potential academic capacity in relation to past or potential candidates, as the questions are relative across years and test forms. STAT scores are then translated into ENTER scores for university admission through calculation of the percentile rank of the candidate in relation to the test-taking population for the previous six years.

== See also ==
- Graduate Medical School Admissions Test (also created by ACER)
- ACT Scaling Test (also created by ACER)
- SAT (College admission test used in the United States)
- College admission in Australia
- Education in Australia
