= Tertiary Entrance Rank =

University entrance score

The Tertiary Entrance Rank (TER) was a tertiary entrance score used in several Australian states, the ACT and the Northern Territory as a tool for selection to universities in Australia. As of 2010, it has been replaced by the Australian Tertiary Admission Rank in all states and territories (including Queensland as of 2020).

== Usage ==
All states in Australia used some form of TER in the 1970s onwards, based upon an aggregated scaling procedure that differed in each jurisdiction. Prior to this, admission to university was based upon a pass/fail criterion for school leavers. The TER was used by university institutions until 2000, where it was replaced by a similar ranking scheme known as the UAI.

== Equivalence ==
The TER was used in New South Wales, Victoria (1994–1998), South Australia, the Northern Territory, Tasmania Western Australia and the Australian Capital Territory. Although directly equivalent to the Equivalent National Tertiary Entrance Rank (ENTER) in Victoria, and the Universities Admission Index (UAI) in New South Wales and later adopted in the Australian Capital Territory, the terms ENTER and UAI were only used in their respective states or territories.

== Calculation of the TER in South Australia and the Northern Territory ==
The TER was accumulated by the South Australian Tertiary Admissions Centre (SATAC) for students who successfully completed the South Australian Certificate of Education (SACE) or the Northern Territory Certificate of Education (NTCE) and fulfilled other criteria to qualify for a TER.

In South Australia, students' subject achievement scores (out of 20) were forwarded to SATAC by the Senior Secondary Assessment Board of South Australia (SSABSA), whereupon they were scaled (adjusted according to the level of performance in the group of students studying the subject in that year to ensure that each subject contributes equally to the TER).

The university aggregate was then calculated by adding:

- the scaled scores for the best four subjects,
- 50% of the scaled score for the next best (fifth) subject.

The university aggregates (out of 90) were ordered from lowest to highest, and the TER was assigned as a percentage rank (in steps of 0.05, ranging from 0.00 to 99.95) according to the student's position on that list.

The process was the same for secondary students in the Northern Territory, except results were forwarded to SATAC by the Northern Territory Board of Studies.

== Calculation of the TER in Tasmania ==
The TER was calculated by the Tasmanian Qualifications Authority for students who successfully completed the Tasmanian Certificate of Education (TCE) and fulfilled other criteria to qualify for a TER.

The tertiary entrance aggregate was calculated as the sum of the best five Level 5 TCE subject scores, of which a maximum of two could be selected from Year 11.

As in other TER systems, the aggregates were ranked in order and assigned a TER based on their position.

== Calculation of the TER in Western Australia ==
The TER was calculated by the Tertiary Institutions Service Centre (TISC) for students who successfully completed the Western Australian Certificate of Education (WACE) and fulfilled other criteria to qualify for a TER.

As the WACE qualification was being revised for from 2005 to 2009, the process for calculating the TER for WA students was changed for tertiary entry in 2009. In 2008, a Tertiary Entrance Aggregate (TEA) was calculated using the sum of the four highest Course of Study Levels of Achievement.

As in other TER systems, the TEAs were ranked in order and assigned a ranking based on their position.

== Calculation of the TER in the Australian Capital Territory ==
Calculation of the ACT TER is detailed in this 1992 ACT Board of Senior Secondary Studies information booklet.

== See also ==
- Equivalent National Tertiary Entrance Rank
- Universities Admission Index
- Australian Tertiary Admission Rank
