= Queensland Certificate of Education =

School qualification offered in Queensland, Australia

The Queensland Certificate of Education (QCE) is the certificate awarded to students completing their secondary schooling in Queensland. The QCE was introduced in 2008, to replace the Senior Certificate. It is currently issued by the Queensland Curriculum and Assessment Authority (QCAA).

== Structure ==
The Queensland Certificate of Education is generally awarded to students completing Year 12, though alternative avenues of study are available.

All Queensland courses of study are awarded credits, which can contribute towards a QCE. These courses are divided into:

- Core courses
- Preparatory courses
- Enrichment courses
- Advanced courses

Core courses are the most common form of education undertaken in Years 10, 11 and 12 and include both Authority and Authority-registered subjects. Authority subjects are those whose syllabuses are maintained by the QSA and whose results contribute to a student's Australian Tertiary Admission Rank (ATAR), which is the ranking used for entrance to tertiary education institutions, whereas Authority-registered subjects are developed from a Study Area Specification. Authority-registered subjects do not contribute to the ATAR of a student. Preparatory and Enrichment courses are commonly Vocational Education and Training (VET) qualifications, which often result in Certificate qualifications. Advanced courses are often university subjects completed alongside a student's regular secondary schooling.

=== Assessment ===
Students are assessed based upon the subjects which they undertake. A student's final grade is given as a Level of Achievement, of which there are five grades:

- Very High Achievement (VHA), roughly equivalent to an "A"
- High Achievement (HA), roughly equivalent to a "B"
- Sound Achievement (SA), roughly equivalent to a "C"
- Limited Achievement (LA), roughly equivalent to a "D"
- Very Limited Achievement (VLA), roughly equivalent to an "E"

Each of these achievement levels are split into 10 rungs, to further differentiate the achievement of individual students. A VHA10 is the highest mark a student can achieve for a subject and a VLA1 is the lowest. These marks, along with the weighting of subjects (determined by students' academic performance in the Queensland Core Skills Test) is responsible in determining a students ATAR.

== Award ==
In order to be awarded a QCE, a student must be awarded at least 20 credits from their studies, in which at least 12 credits must come from Core courses. Core courses not fully completed may also contribute some credits, however the level of achievement must be at least a Sound Achievement (or Pass). In addition, a student must pass the literacy and numeracy requirements. Even if failing to receive a QCE at the end of Year 12, a student may continue to work towards one, though credits expire after nine years. A student's result in the Queensland Core Skills Test also appears on their QCE as a letter grade.

== See also ==
- Education in Australia
- Overall Position
- Senior External Examination
