= Higher School Certificate (New South Wales) =

Secondary school credential in New South Wales, Australia

The Higher School Certificate (HSC) is the credential awarded to secondary school students who successfully complete senior high school level studies (Years 10, 11 and 12 or equivalent) in New South Wales and some ACT schools in Australia, as well as some international schools in Singapore, Malaysia, Indonesia, China, Vietnam, Papua New Guinea, and Tonga. It was first introduced in 1967, and is currently developed and managed by the NSW Education Standards Authority (NESA).

== Structure ==
The majority of students undertake HSC-related courses over the final two years of high school, though it is possible to undertake different study patterns over different time periods or through different teaching organisations. To be eligible for the HSC, students must:

- Satisfactorily complete Year 9 & 10, or obtain equivalent qualifications recognised by the NSW Education Standards Authority (NESA).
- Attend a government school, an accredited non-government school, a NESA recognised school outside NSW, or a TAFE college.
- Successfully complete the HSC: All My Own Work program before submitting any work for Preliminary or HSC courses (except if only enrolled in Life Skills courses).
- Satisfactorily complete the required courses as part of the specified study patterns.
- Sit for, and make a serious attempt at HSC exams as required.
- Meet the HSC minimum standard of literacy and numeracy within 5 years of starting their HSC course.

There are a large number of possible courses that students can study, totalling over 100 (including languages), in a wide range of subject areas. However, schools have control over the courses that they offer students, from which they must choose. The only compulsory subject area is English, with one of English Advanced, English Standard, English as an Additional Language or Dialect (EAL/D), or English Studies required for the award of the HSC. Individual schools may require their students to undertake certain courses, as is the case with Studies of Religion in many religious schools or Agriculture in agricultural schools, however, these are internal school requirements separate from HSC requirements.

Most courses offered comprise a preliminary (typically Year 11) component and a HSC (typically Year 12) component. As a general rule, the preliminary component must be completed prior to the HSC component. Furthermore, each subject is designated as either one or two "units". Each unit of study involves 60 hours of indicative time in each of the preliminary and HSC courses. Ten units is the minimum number of units required; however, students can attempt more should they choose.

To be eligible for the award of the HSC a student must have:

- at least 12 preliminary units and at least 10 HSC units
- 6 units of Board Developed Courses
- 2 units of a Board Developed Course in English
- 3 courses of 2 or more units (board developed courses, or board endorsed courses)
- 4 subjects

Some courses have certain rules and prerequisites such as:

- An extension course can only be enrolled in if they are enrolled in the corresponding 2-unit course.
- A maximum of one non-extension course from a subject (e.g. both Mathematics Standard and Advanced is not permitted).
- In courses with option exams, a student can only enrol in the optional exam if they have enrolled in the corresponding course (in the case of VET, the 240-hour or 360-hour course where applicable).

Further restrictions may apply in certain subject areas. Further requirements regarding study patterns apply if the student wishes to apply for a separate Australian Tertiary Admission Rank (ATAR) based on their HSC performance. If they do, their final ATAR mark is calculated using their best 2 units of English and 8 best other units. Extension courses, each with a value of one unit, may be included in the study program, meaning that a certain subject area may have up to four units, e.g. English (Advanced) (two units) plus English Extension 1 and English Extension 2 (each worth one unit).

=== Types of courses ===
There are two main types of courses available in the HSC: Board Developed Courses and Board Endorsed Courses.

Board Developed Courses (BDCs), also known as HSC courses, have a syllabus and final exam set by NESA and may contribute to the calculation of the ATAR. They are the most common type of course in NSW and are inclusive of Life Skills courses and VET Industry Curriculum Framework courses.

Board Endorsed Courses (BECs) are developed outside of NESA (such as TAFE) and may vary from school to school in regard to content and assessment. They do not have a HSC exam and they cannot contribute to the calculation of a student's ATAR. Before they can be taught, they must be endorsed by NESA and follow NESA's rules regarding BEC courses. There are four types of Board Endorsed Courses:

- Content Endorsed Courses (CECs) are developed by NESA to cater for a wide candidature in areas of specific need not served by Board Developed Courses.
- School Developed Board Endorsed Courses (SDBECs) are developed by schools where the curriculum needs cannot be served by BDCs or CECs.
- University Developed Board Endorsed Courses (UDBECs) are developed by universities in conjunction with schools and typically supplement or extend on the HSC curriculum in areas not supported by BDCs or other types of BECs.
- VET Board Endorsed Course (VEC BECs) are courses based on national industry training Packages that are endorsed by NESA where the need for the courses is not already covered by VET courses already offered by NESA.

=== Assessment ===
For most board developed courses, a student's final mark in each subject is determined by a combination of in-school assessments conducted throughout the HSC component of the course (constituting 50% of their HSC mark) and an externally administered final exam, typically held in October or November of that year (constituting 50% of their HSC mark). For in-school assessments, schools prepare and run an assessment program for each course, in line with NESA requirements such as which course components are assessed and how they are weighted in the assessment. Schools are responsible for setting assessment tasks such as exams, assignments, fieldwork or practical activities, as well as deciding due dates. The external exam is then used to statistically moderate in-school assessment results between different schools before calculating the student's final mark in the subject, typically out of 100 for 2-unit courses and out of 50 for 1-unit courses.

For most board endorsed courses, the assessment is administered by the school and does not have an associated HSC exam. Depending on the requirement of the course, an unmoderated mark will be awarded, or the course will be marked as completed.

=== Award ===
Upon successful completion of a satisfactory pattern of study, students are awarded the Higher School Certificate by way of a testamur. NESA provides the results of all student results to the Universities Admissions Centre (UAC) to calculate an Australian Tertiary Admission Rank (ATAR) based on their HSC performance (separate from NESA). To be eligible for an ATAR, students must:

- Complete at least 10 units of HSC courses (board developed courses)
- Complete at least 8 units from Category A courses
- Complete at least 2 units of English
- Complete three courses of Board Developed Courses of 2 units or greater
- Complete 4 subjects

The ATAR is then calculated from the best 2 units of English and the best 8 units from your remaining units, which can include no more than 2 units of Category B courses. The ATAR is then used for admission to universities across Australia.

Furthermore, whenever a student has completed a board developed course, they also receive feedback regarding their results in that course, which typically includes exam results, school assessment results and the performance band in which their performance lies. Each band represents a particular range of marks. For 2 unit courses:

- Band 6 - 90-100 marks
- Band 5 - 80-89 marks
- Band 4 - 70-79 marks
- Band 3 - 60-69 marks
- Band 2 - 50-59 marks
- Band 1 - 0-49 marks

For extension courses:

- E4 - 45-50 marks
- E3 - 35-44 marks
- E2 - 25-34 marks
- E1 - 0-24 marks

Students who achieve high marks are celebrated on HSC merit lists. The four types of merit lists are:

- First in course - awarded to the student who achieves first place in the course (i.e. the highest score) and scores in the highest band possible.
- Top achievers in course (also known as a 'state rank') - awarded to students who place within a predetermined number of top scores (typically top 5, 10 or 20) and scores in the highest band possible.
- Distinguished Achievers - awarded to students who achieve the highest band possible for one or more HSC courses (Band 6 or Band E4).
- All-round achievers - awarded to students who achieve the highest band possible in 10 or more units of HSC courses.

== Available courses ==
There are two main types of courses available in the HSC: Board Developed Courses and Board Endorsed Courses.

=== English ===
Being the only mandatory course for HSC, for English, students must choose between one of the English courses available to study:

- English Standard
- English Advanced
- English Extension 1 (only available to students studying English Advanced)
- English Extension 2 (only available to students studying English Advanced and English Extension 1)
- English as an Additional Language or Dialect (EAL/D) (only available to eligible students)
- English Studies

=== Elective Courses ===
The following is a list of elective Board Developed Courses currently available to students.

HSIE (Human Society and Its Environment):

- Aboriginal Studies
- Ancient History
- Business Studies
- Economics
- Geography
- History Extension
- Legal Studies
- Modern History
- Society and Culture
- Studies of Religion I
- Studies of Religion II

Mathematics:

- Mathematics Standard 1
- Mathematics Standard 2
- Mathematics Advanced
- Mathematics Extension 1 (only available to students studying Mathematics Advanced)
- Mathematics Extension 2 (only available to students studying Mathematics Advanced and Mathematics Extension 1; only available in Year 12)

Science:

- Biology
- Chemistry
- Earth and Environmental Science
- Physics
- Investigating Science
- Science Extension (only available to students studying 1 Unit of any Science in Year 12)

TAS (Technological and Applied Studies):

- Agriculture
- Design and Technology
- Engineering Studies
- Food Technology
- Industrial Technology
- Enterprise Computing
- Software Engineering
- Textiles and Design

Creative Arts:

- Dance
- Drama
- Music 1
- Music 2
- Music Extension (only available to students studying Music 2)
- Visual Arts

PDHPE (Personal Development, Health and Physical Education):

- Health and Movement Science
- Community and Family Studies

=== Content Endorsed Courses ===
Content Endorsed Courses (CEC) fall under Board Endorsed Courses.

- Exploring Early Childhood (PDHPE)
- Sport, Lifestyle and Recreation Activities (PDHPE)
- Ceramics (Creative Arts)
- Photography, Video and Digital Imaging (Creative Arts)
- Visual Design (Creative Arts)
- Computing Applications (TAS)
- Marine Studies (TAS)
- Work Studies (HSIE)
- Aboriginal Languages (Languages)

=== Language Courses ===
Languages are also offered as Beginners, Continuers, Extension, Background Speakers and recently, Heritage courses. Only one course of any one language may be taken, with the exception of Extension, available only to students taking the Continuers course. Due to the large number of language courses, they have been listed separately. The letters B (beginners), C (continuers), E (extension), BS (background speakers), H (heritage) indicate which courses are available for study.

From 2017, background speakers and heritage courses were renamed to In Context and Literature, affecting Chinese, Indonesian, Japanese and Korean students in those courses.

Continuers refers to languages that were studied in Year 9 and will be continued in Years 10, 11 and 12. In some cases, where a student has not studied the language in Year 9 due to not being able to, exemption may be granted to study Continuers based on cultural heritage and fluency. The School of Languages usually only does this, home school enrolments into these courses usually require the Year 9 prerequisite to attempt them.

Where the provision for language learning does not exist at the home school, the NSW School of Languages in Petersham offers all languages examinable by NESA. The below list is all the languages offered by NESA that were offered in the 2023 Higher School Certificate:

- Arabic B, C, E
- Armenian C
- Chinese B, C, E, BS, H
- Classical Greek C, E
- Classical Hebrew C, E
- Croatian C
- Dutch C
- Filipino C
- French B, C, E
- German B, C, E
- Hindi C
- Hungarian C
- Indonesian B, C, E, BS, H
- Italian B, C, E
- Japanese B, C, E, BS, H
- Khmer C
- Korean C, BS, H
- Latin C, E
- Macedonian C
- Maltese C
- Modern Greek B, C, E
- Modern Hebrew C
- Polish C
- Portuguese C
- Punjabi C
- Serbian C
- Spanish B, C, E
- Swedish C
- Tamil C
- Turkish C
- Vietnamese C

=== VET Courses ===
In addition, some VET (Vocational Education and Training) courses are offered. In addition to HSC credit, completion of these courses may earn an industry Certificate II. There are 13 Board Developed Courses (BDC) and 106 Board Endorsed courses (BEC).

Board Developed Courses:

- Automotive
- Business Services
- Construction
- Electrotechnology
- Entertainment Industry
- Financial Services
- Hospitality
- Human Services
- Information and Digital Technology
- Metal and Engineering
- Primary Industries
- Retail Services
- Tourism, Travel and Events

Board Endorsed Courses:

- Aboriginal and/or Torres Strait Islander Cultural Arts
- Aboriginal Languages for Social Use
- Active Volunteering
- Aeroskills
- Agricultural Mechanical Technology
- Air Conditioning and Refrigeration
- Animal Care
- Appliance Service
- Applied Digital Technologies
- Applied Fashion Design and Technology
- Aquaculture
- Aquatics and Community Recreation
- Assistant Dance Teaching
- Auslan
- Automotive Body Repair Technology
- Automotive Glazing Technology
- Automotive Manufacturing Technical Operations – Bus Truck and Trailer
- Automotive Refinishing Technology
- Automotive Tyre Servicing Technology
- Aviation (Cabin Crew)
- Aviation (Remote Pilot)
- Baking – Certificate II
- Baking – Certificate III
- Barbering
- Beauty Services (Make-Up)
- Beauty Services (Nail Technology)
- Beauty Services (Retail Cosmetics)
- Beauty Therapy School-based Apprenticeship
- Beekeeping
- Bicycle Workshop Operations
- Bread Baking
- Cake and Pastry
- Christian Ministry and Theology
- Civil Construction
- Community Dance, Theatre and Events
- Community Services – Introduction
- Community Services
- Creative Industries
- Dental Assisting
- Design Fundamentals
- Disability
- Early Childhood Education and Care
- Engineering – Certificate I
- Engineering – Certificate II
- Engineering Pathways
- Engineering School-based Apprenticeship – Fabrication
- Engineering School-based Apprenticeship – Mechanical
- Firefighting Operations
- Fitness
- Flooring Technology
- Floristry
- Furnishing School‑based Apprenticeship
- Furniture Making Pathways
- Hair or Beauty Services
- Hairdressing School‑based Apprenticeship
- Heavy Commercial Vehicle Mechanical Technology
- Horse Care
- Hospital or Health Services Pharmacy Support
- Laboratory Skills
- Landscape Construction
- Locksmithing
- Manufacturing and Engineering – Introduction
- Marine Craft Construction
- Marine Mechanical Technology
- Maritime Operations – Certificate I
- Maritime Operations – Certificate II
- Meat Processing (Abattoirs)
- Meat Processing (Retail Butcher)
- Mobile Plant Technology
- Motorcycle Mechanical Technology
- Music Industry – Introduction
- Music Industry
- Outdoor Recreation
- Outside School Hours Care
- Parks and Gardens – Certificate II
- Parks and Gardens – Certificate III
- Plumbing – Introduction
- Plumbing
- Process Manufacturing
- Racing Industry
- Real Estate Practice – Certificate III
- Real Estate Practice – Certificate IV
- Recreation and Sport
- Resources and Infrastructure
- Retail
- Salon Assistant
- School Based Education Support
- Screen and Media
- Shearing
- Shopfitting
- Signs and Graphics
- Skills for Work and Vocational Pathways
- Sport – Athlete
- Sport – Developing Athlete
- Sport and Recreation – Certificate II
- Sport and Recreation – Certificate III
- Sport Coaching – Certificate II
- Sport Coaching – Certificate III
- Sports Turf Management
- Supply Chain Operations
- Surveying and Spatial Information Services
- Visual Arts and Contemporary Craft
- Wall and Ceiling Lining
- Water Industry Operations
- Wool Handling
- Workplace Skills – Certificate II

=== Life Skills ===
For students who may have intellectual disabilities or struggle with the standard course, there are options. The eligibility is limited.

The following courses have a Life Skills choice:

- English
- Mathematics
- Investigating Science
- Physical World Science
- Earth and Space Science
- Living World Science
- Chemical World Science
- Agriculture
- Design and Technology
- Food Technology
- Industrial Technology
- Information Processes and Technology
- Technology
- Textiles and Design
- Aboriginal Studies
- Ancient History
- Business and Economics
- Citizenship and Legal Studies
- Geography
- Human Society and its Environment
- Modern History
- Society and Culture
- Studies of Religion I
- Studies of Religion II
- Work and the Community
- Creative Arts
- Dance
- Drama
- Music
- Visual Arts
- Community and Family Studies
- Health and Movement Science

== HSC syllabus reform (2019) ==
A major HSC syllabus reform was executed in 2019. The "new" syllabus involved the addition of "Science Extension" and "Investigating Science" as new courses. These courses were made available to students that commenced teaching in October 2018 for the cohort of 2019. The course "Senior Science" was discontinued as of October 2018. The reformed syllabus involved changes that are a move towards compulsory English, Physics, Chemistry, Biology, Investigating Science and Extension Science in the future.

=== English ===
Changes introduced to compulsory English discontinued the field of study "Discovery" as NESA discovered students would simply hire and pay off third party tutoring companies and/or private tutors in order to completely memorise and regurgitate essay information, in turn causing an imbalance in advantage towards the state of NSW. For the new syllabus, English questions have now become more specific, prompting on-the-spot answers in turn rigorously testing students natural English writing ability and ability to analyse and interpret unseen questions, texts and information.

=== Mathematics ===
Also included in this reform was making mathematics a mandatory HSC subject, effective starting with the HSC class of 2026, but this was later revoked and a NESA spokesperson clarified that mathematics would remain optional.

== Vocational equivalent ==
The vocational equivalent to Year 12 will change from certificate II in 2015 to certificate III in 2020 by the Council of Australian Governments, mainly because Year 12 qualification has minimal hours greater than those of a level II qualification, where they correspond more closely to the hours of level III qualification. Although the completion of high school would lead to better labour market results, it is also established that a scholarly pathway is not always suited for all and that some are unaccustomed to the institutionalised nature of schools. This has led to an understanding that there should be alternatives to Year 12 completion. As such, the idea of a vocational equivalent to Year 12 is a response to this. The construct of a vocational equivalent to completing a senior school certificate (denoted by the completion of Year 12) has been an attribute of government policy since the late 1990s, with a declaration stating:

"All students have access to the high quality education necessary to enable the completion of school education to Year 12 or its vocational equivalent and that provides clear and recognised pathways to employment and further education and training."

== Impact on adolescents ==
A NSW Health report found that 1 in 11 adolescents who committed suicide had experienced significant levels of HSC-related stress.

Abolition of the HSC ATAR has been called for by some teachers, principals, academics, and university chancellors. It has been suggested that the ATAR system associated with the completion of the HSC is a major cause of mental health issues amongst young people.

== See also ==
- Education in Australia
- University admission
- Victorian Certificate of Education
- South Australian Certificate of Education
- Tasmanian Certificate of Education
- Western Australian Certificate of Education
- ACT Scaling Test
- Queensland Certificate of Education
- Bored of Studies
