= ACT Scaling Test =

The ACT Scaling Test (AST) is a test of aptitude in studies for Year 12 students in the Australian Capital Territory (ACT) set by the ACT Board of Senior Secondary Studies (BSSS) and created by the Australian Council for Educational Research (ACER). It is used to rank students and colleges for the calculation of an Australian Tertiary Admission Rank (ATAR) as of June 2009.

The AST consists of a multiple choice test (2 hrs 15 mins, 80 questions), a short answer test (1 hr 45 mins), and an argumentative essay (2 hrs 30 mins, 600 words). The AST is designed to test the aptitude of a student rather their knowledge. Questions cover a range of subjects including mathematics, science, social studies and humanities but do not require knowledge in those fields.

The first sitting of the AST occurs on the first Tuesday and Wednesday of September. There is a second sitting of the AST during October for those who missed the first sitting due to illness or misadventure.

== See also ==
- Special Tertiary Admissions Test (also created by ACER)
- Graduate Medical School Admissions Test (also created by ACER )
