= Japanese School of Melbourne =

The Japanese School of Melbourne
- メルボルン日本人学校

Location
- 6 Ellington St; Caulfield South, 3162; Australia; 37°53′32.6″S 145°1′10.3″E

Information
- Type: International school
- Established: 1986
- Website: jsm.vic.edu.au

The Japanese School of Melbourne (JSM) (メルボルン日本人学校, Meruborun Nihonjin Gakkō) is a Japanese international school located in Caulfield South, Victoria in the Melbourne area. The school uses a Japanese curriculum and the school is tailored to Japanese temporary residents; however is considered to be a state school by the Victorian Government.

The school covers elementary and junior high school levels. Most students attend for around two to five years, and are temporary migrants rather than permanent settlers. When students at JSM reach high school age, most go to Japan to attend high school. Not all short-term Japanese residents in Melbourne send their children to the JSM, as some prefer to send their children to Australian schools.

Tetsuo Mizukami (水上 徹男 Mizukami Tetsuo), author of The Sojourner Community: Japanese Migration and Residency in Australia, wrote in 2007 that "When compared with Japanese schools in Sydney and Perth," the JSM "exhibits a somewhat remote stance in its interaction with the local community." Unlike the other two Japanese schools, the school in Melbourne does not offer international classes that allow non-Japanese students to partake in the Japanese-language programmes. Several Japanese families settled in the area around Caulfield due to the location of the JSM.

== History ==
Mizukami stated that the Japanese Chamber of Commerce, which was established in 1963, and the Japanese Society of Melbourne (JSM), which had been established in 1965, were the "driving force" behind the establishment of the school. In the 1960s a women's association held negotiations and meetings with Japanese people on where to conduct classes. Some of the Japanese individuals they negotiated with were lecturers at Monash University. On 25 July 1968 the Department of Education of the State of Victoria permitted the society to use the premises of the Malvern Central State School for a supplementary Japanese lessons. It opened in September of that year. While many Japanese wanted a full-time Japanese school, the government of Victoria had not yet granted permission to establish it. In September 1972 a full Saturday only Japanese program opened. At one time Japanese officials asked for permission for the establishment of a Japanese school when the Premier of Victoria had approached them to discuss the possibility of further Japanese investment in Victoria.

The property of the Holy Cross Primary School went up for sale in 1981, and the supplementary school asked Japanese people to join a subscription effort. The supplementary school purchased the property in May 1982. On 21 June 1984 the school, prompted by the chamber of commerce, appointed a committee for establishing a full time Japanese school. The school board asked for funds to buy four prefabricated classrooms in February 1985. These classrooms were completed in December 1985. The Victorian state government stated its willingness to allow a full time Japanese school to be operated in April 1986. In May 1986 an invitation for subscriptions circulated among the Japanese. On 13 May 1986, the full time school opened at its current location with 96 students. A new Japanese supplementary school in Melbourne opened because the previous supplementary school had converted into a full time school; therefore most of the initial students of the JSM were previously students of the predecessor supplementary school.

The peak enrolment of the JSM was over 150 students. The 1990s recession in Japan forced many families of employees of Japanese companies to return to Japan, so the student body declined. As of 2012 the school had 53 students, including 3 preparatory students, 33 students in primary school, and 17 students in secondary school.

== Operations ==
As of 1996 the school received subsidies from the Australian and Japanese governments, and a head official of the school stated that therefore the JSM had tuition that is about 33% of those of area private schools.

== Curriculum ==
Over 90% of the school's coursework is in the Japanese language. The curriculum and selection of the teaching staff is oriented towards Japanese people temporarily living in Australia, and the school management also is oriented towards that clientele.

In 1987 the JSM established interchange classes with area Australian schools at the junior high school level. The school created a civics textbook on Australian society in February 1992.

== Student body ==
Most students are temporary residents of Australia, though some are from Japanese families who permanently moved to Australia. In 1996 400 children of ages 6–15, the ages for elementary and junior high school, lived in Melbourne, and of those 25% went to the JSM, with the remainder going to Australian schools. At the time some Japan-born children attended Australian schools and were moved to a nihonjin gakkō for their final year in Australia, since they were due to return to Japan.

== Recreation ==
Every October school holds the Japanese School Festival. The festival includes kimono for visitors to try on, Japanese food, and karate demonstrations.

== See also ==
- Japanese community of Melbourne
- Japanese Australian

Other part-time Japanese schools in Australia

- Canberra Japanese Supplementary School
- Japanese Language Supplementary School of Queensland
