= Japanese Australians =

Japanese Australians 日系オーストラリア人

Total population
- 71,013-100,000; 45,267 (by birth); 50,761 (by ancestry)

Regions with significant populations
- Sydney · Melbourne · Brisbane · Perth · Adelaide · Gold Coast · Cairns · Broome · Torres Strait Islands

Languages
- Australian English · Japanese; Broome Pearling Lugger Pidgin

Religion
- Irreligion, Buddhism, Christianity, Shinto and others

Related ethnic groups
- Asian Australians · Japanese New Zealanders

Japanese Australians (日系オーストラリア人, Nikkei Ōsutoraria-jin) are Australian citizens and residents who claim Japanese ancestry.

Japanese people first arrived in the 1870s (despite a ban on emigration in place until 1886). During the late 19th and early 20th centuries Japanese migrants played a prominent role in the pearl industry of north-western Australia. By 1911, the Japanese population while small groups had grown to approximately 3,500 people. With the outbreak of war in the Pacific in 1941, most Japanese in Australia were interned and then deported when the war ended. At the end of the war only 74 Japanese citizens and their children were permitted to remain in Australia. Not until the 1970s did the Japanese population recover to the levels at the start of the 20th century. As of 2011, of Australia's 35,378 Japan-born residents, more than 65% had arrived from the mid-1990s onwards.

According to a global survey conducted at the end of 2013, Australia was the most popular country for Japanese people to live in.

== History ==
The first person from Japan to settle in Australia was recorded in 1871.

Japanese only began to emigrate en masse in the 1880s following the lifting of restrictions. In Australia, the Immigration Restriction Act 1901 temporarily prevented more Japanese from migrating, but subsequent exemptions to the dictation test were applied to Japanese people mitigating restrictions.

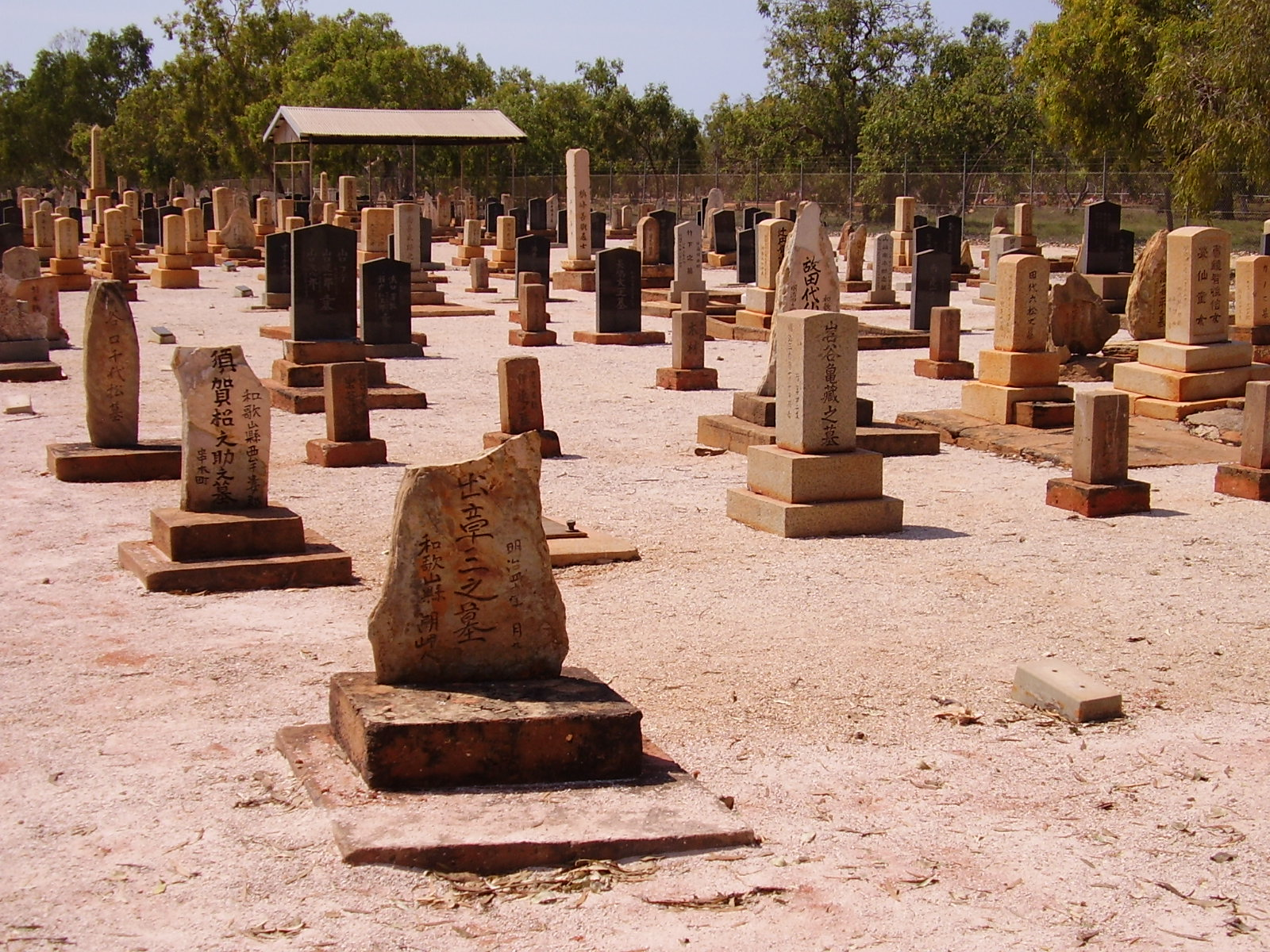
Japanese Cemetery of Broome.

In Australia from the late 19th and early 20th Century many worked as pearlers in Northern Australia or in the sugar cane industry in Queensland. They were particularly prominent in the Western Australian Kimberley town of Broome, where until the Second World War they were the largest ethnic group. Several streets of Broome have Japanese names, the town has one of the largest Japanese cemeteries outside Japan and the creole language Broome Pearling Lugger Pidgin contained many Japanese words.

Between December 1941 and September 1945, Australia and Japan were at war. On July 28, 1941, Australian military intelligence indicated that there were 1139 Japanese living in Australia and 36 in Australian-controlled territories. Under the guise of national security, 1141 Japanese civilians (almost the entire population) living in Australia were interned for up to six years throughout WWII. An additional 3160 Japanese civilians arrested in allied countries across the Asia-Pacific Region were also interned in Australia on a user-pay basis; this included 600 Formosans (Taiwanese). An unknown number of Koreans were arrested as Japanese and carried Japanese names. The internment of Japanese in Australia was more racial than political, with Japanese being "evacuated" from their hometowns "for their own good" (i.e., to prevent racist attacks against them by non-Japanese). Several months after the cessation of hostilities, all ethnic-Japanese internees who did not possess Australian nationality were repatriated to Occupied Japan, regardless of the locations of their previous abodes, whilst all ethnic-Formosans were repatriated to Occupied Formosa.

== Demography ==
People born in Japan as a percentage of the population in Sydney divided geographically by postal area, as of the 2011 census.

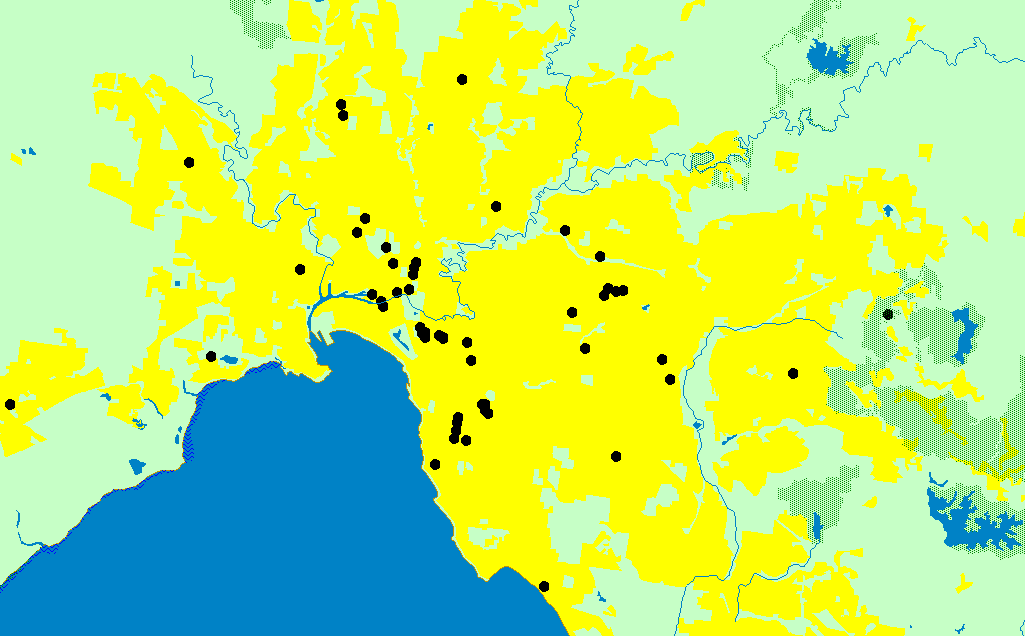
One dot represents 100 Japanese-born residents in Melbourne

The 2021 census recorded 45,267 Japanese-born residents in Australia, with 78,054 people reporting Japanese ancestry (including those who claimed other ancestries). Of this number 58,755 reporting speaking Japanese at home. New South Wales had the largest population of Japanese born (14,894), followed by Queensland (13,236), Victoria (9,251), Western Australia (4,716), and South Australia (1,640). Only 9,734 Japanese-born residents have since acquired Australian citizenship representing 21.5% of the community. In 2021, women represented 70% (31,723) of the Japanese-born in Australia.

Over half of all Japanese-born residents profess no religious affiliation (66.8%), with Buddhism (17.8%) and Christianity (3.1%) the most commonly identified religions.

In Northern Australia (Broome, Darwin, Cairns, Townsville, Mackay, Torres Strait) many Indigenous and non-Indigenous families claim descent from Japanese pearl luggers and sugar-cane cutters who settled in these areas before 1901.

Religion of Japanese Australians (2021)
1. No religion (66.8%)
2. Buddhism (17.8%)
3. Christianity (8.70%)
4. Shinto (2.30%)
5. Others (2.10%)
6. Not answer (2.30%)

== Education ==
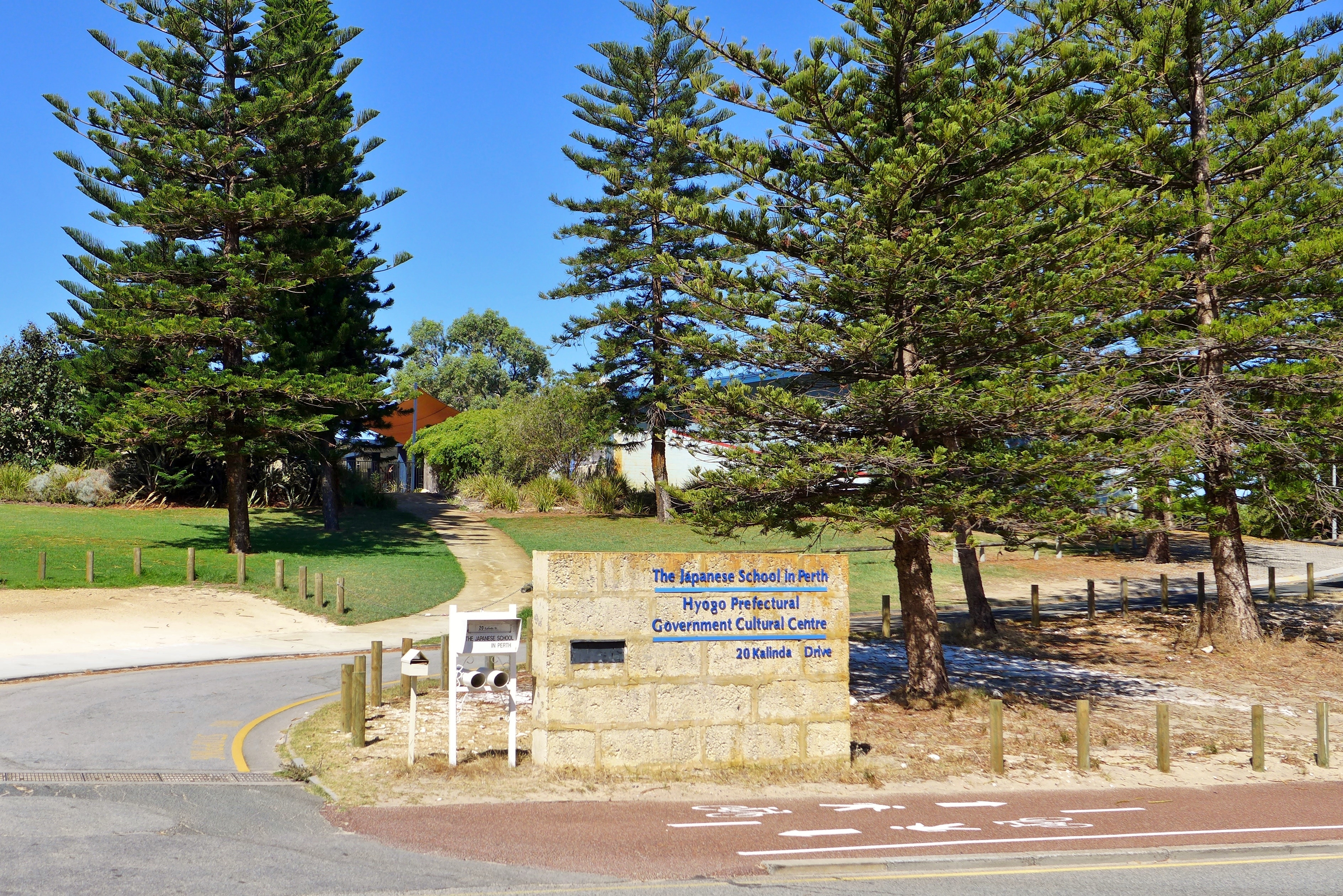
The Japanese School in Perth and the Hyogo Prefectural Government Cultural Centre (兵庫文化交流センター)

Locations of full-time and part-time Japanese schools in Australia designated by the Japanese Ministry of Education (gray dots refer to closed schools)

Japanese international day schools in Australia include the Sydney Japanese International School (SJIS), the Japanese School of Melbourne (JSM), and the Japanese School in Perth (JSP). There are also weekend supplementary programmes in Brisbane, Cairns, Canberra, Melbourne, Perth approved by the Japanese Ministry of Education.

- The Japanese Language Supplementary School of Queensland
- Adelaide Japanese Community School (ACJS; アデレード日本語補習授業校 Aderēdo Nihongo Hoshū Jugyō Kō)
- Cairns Japanese Language Tutorial Centre Inc. (ケアンズ日本語補習授業校 Keanzu Nihongo Hoshū Jugyō Kō)
- Canberra Japanese Supplementary School
- Melbourne International School of Japanese
- The Weekend Japanese School in Perth

== Notable figures ==
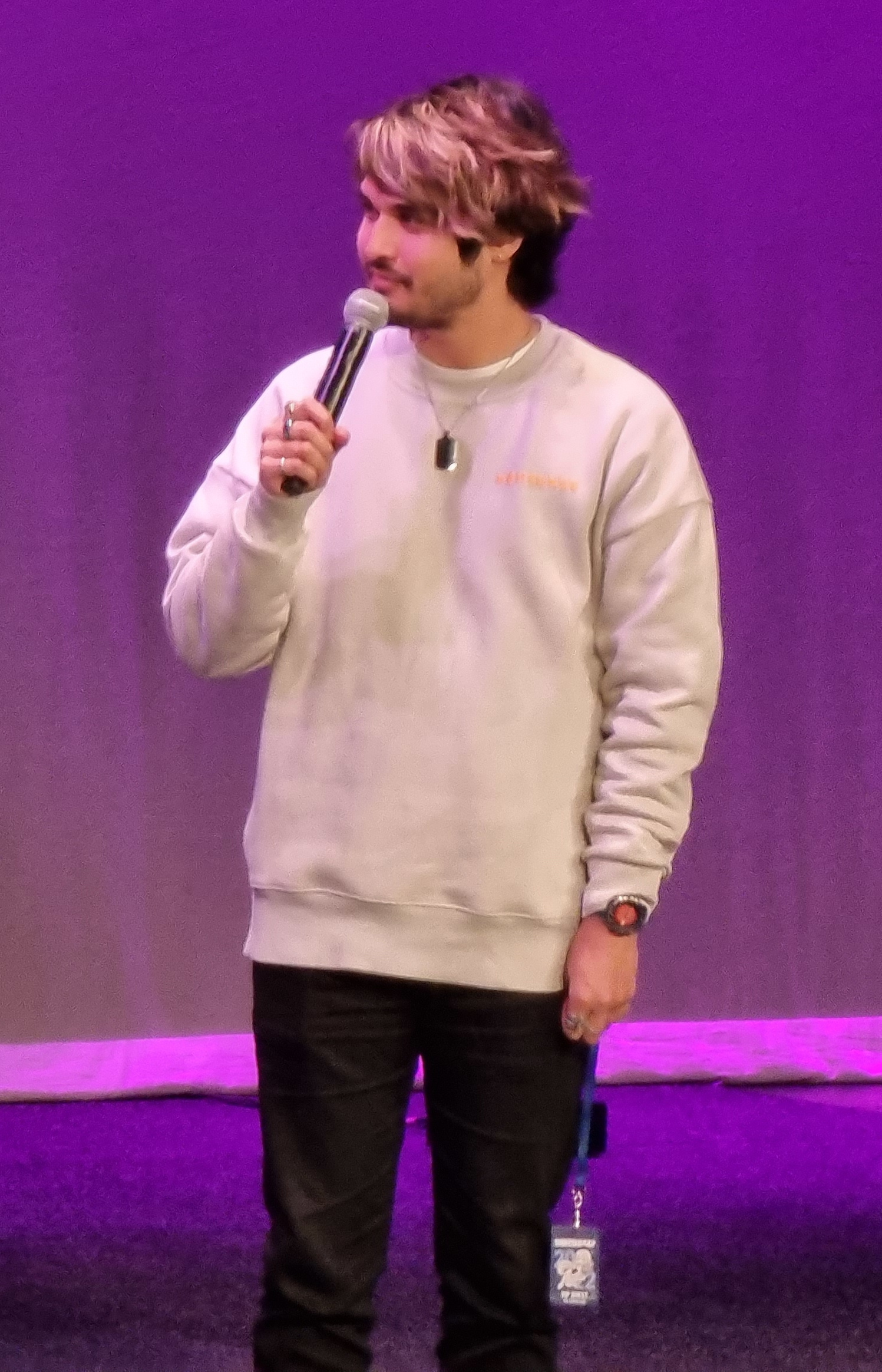
Joey Bizinger

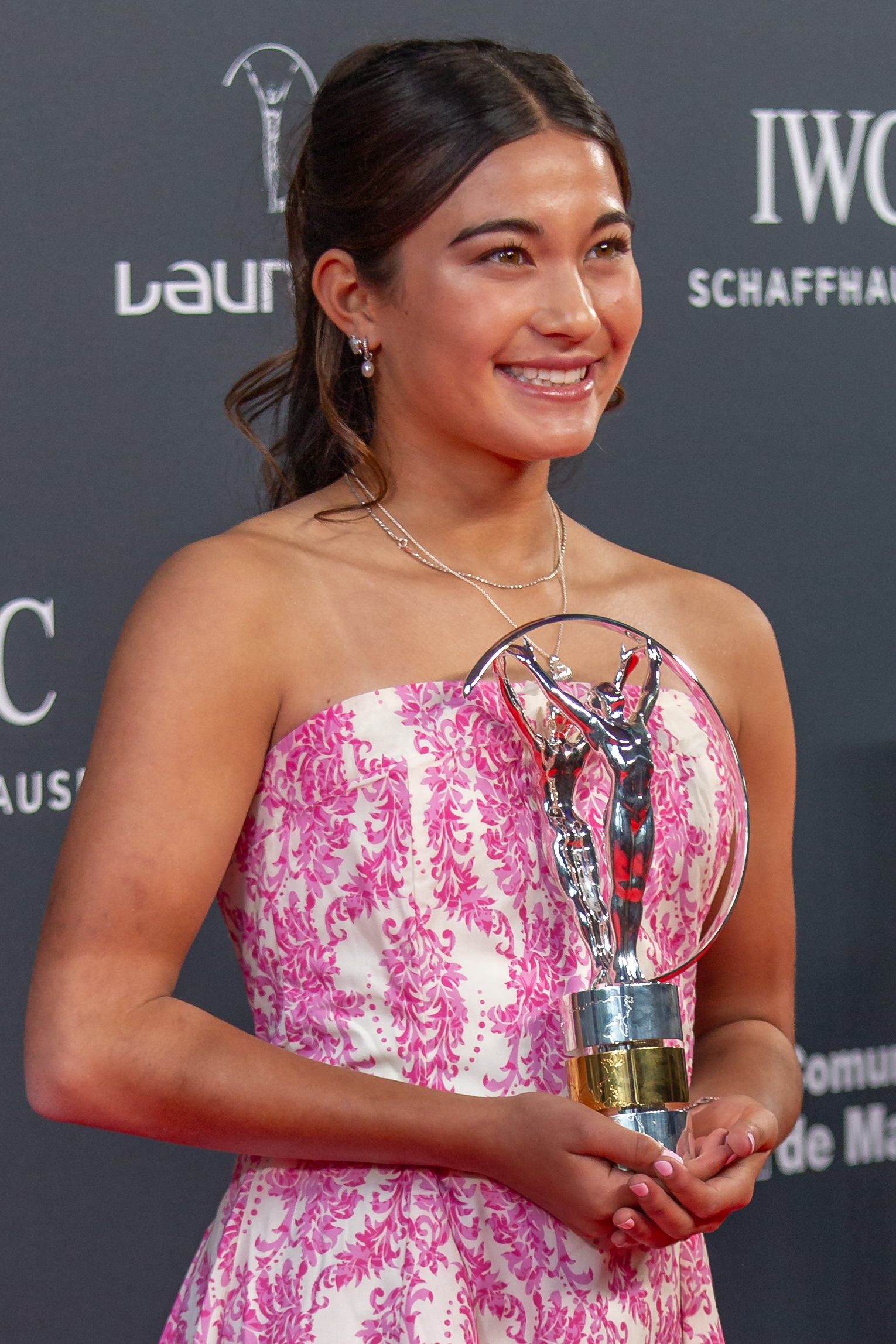
Arisa Trew

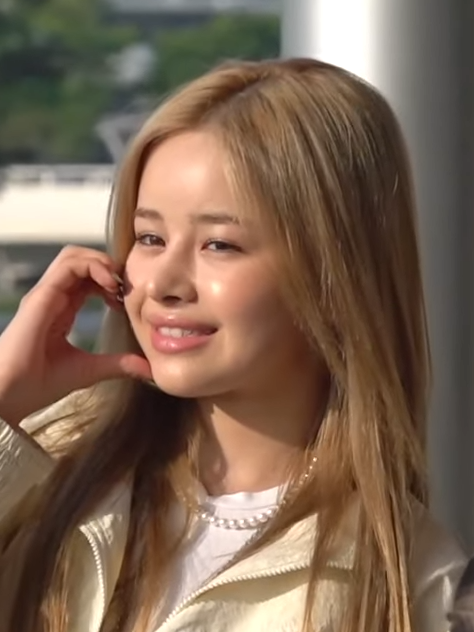
Amy Harvey

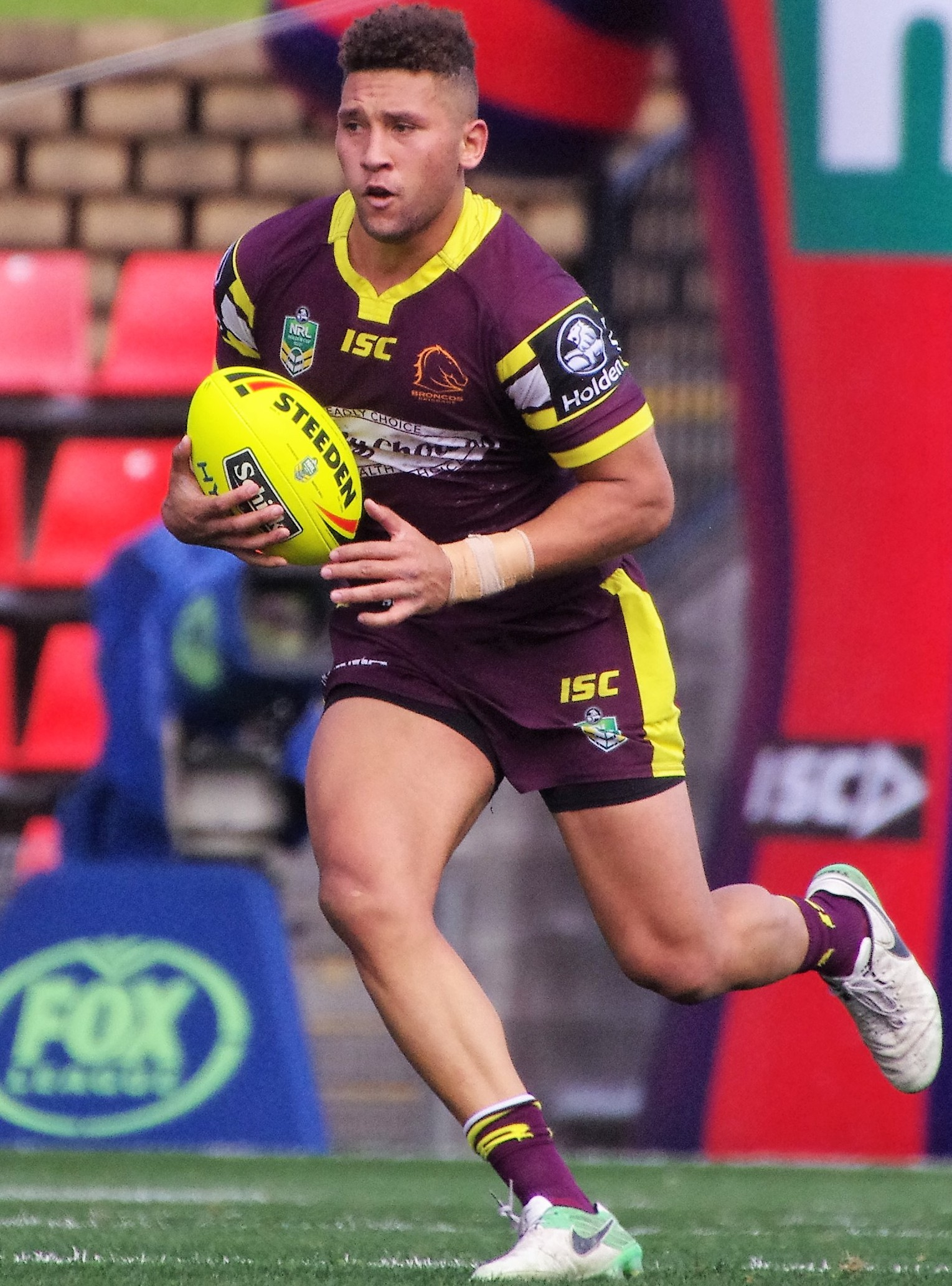
Gehamat Shibasaki

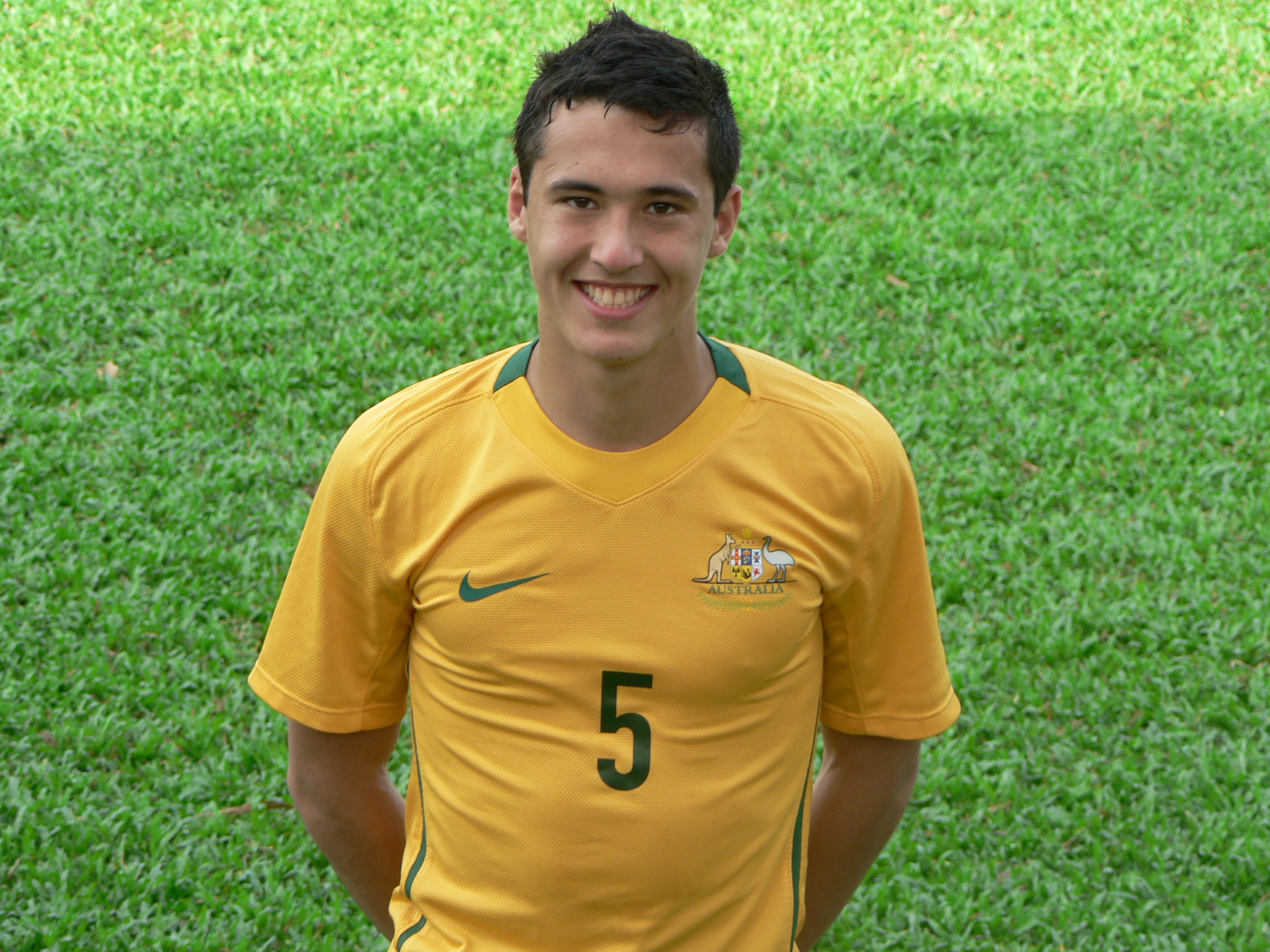
Jason Davidson

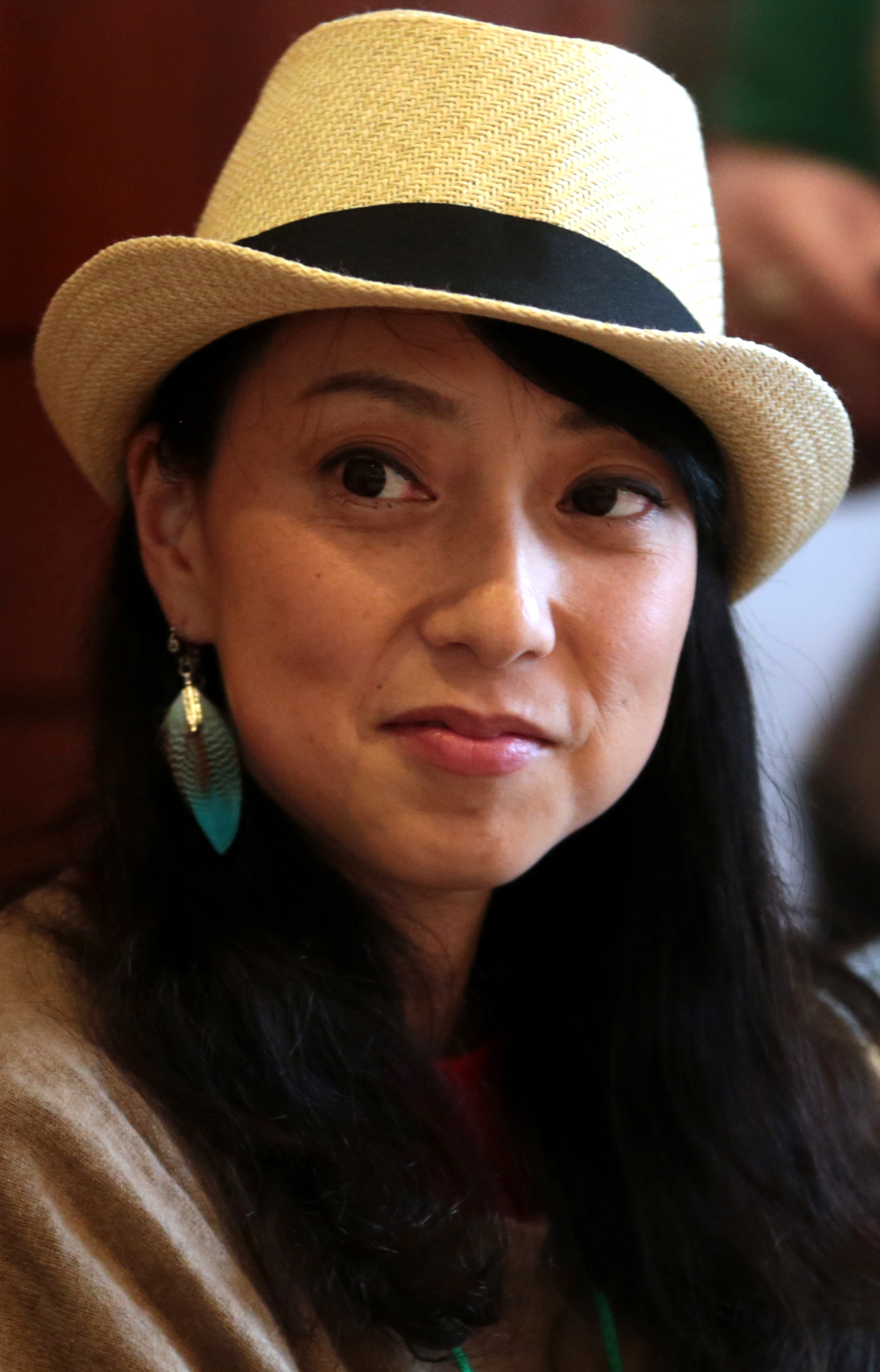
Yūko Miyamura

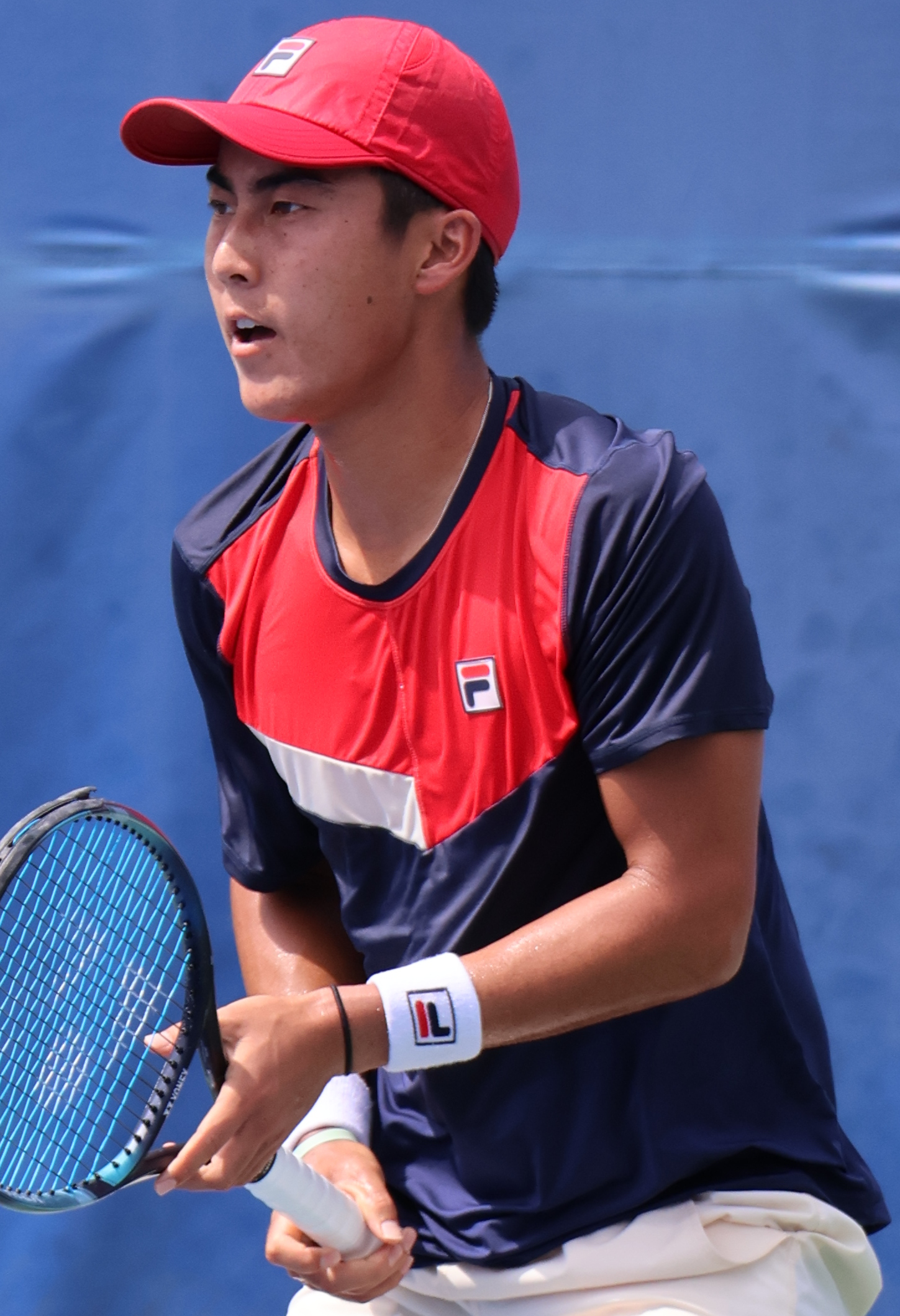
Rinky Hijikata

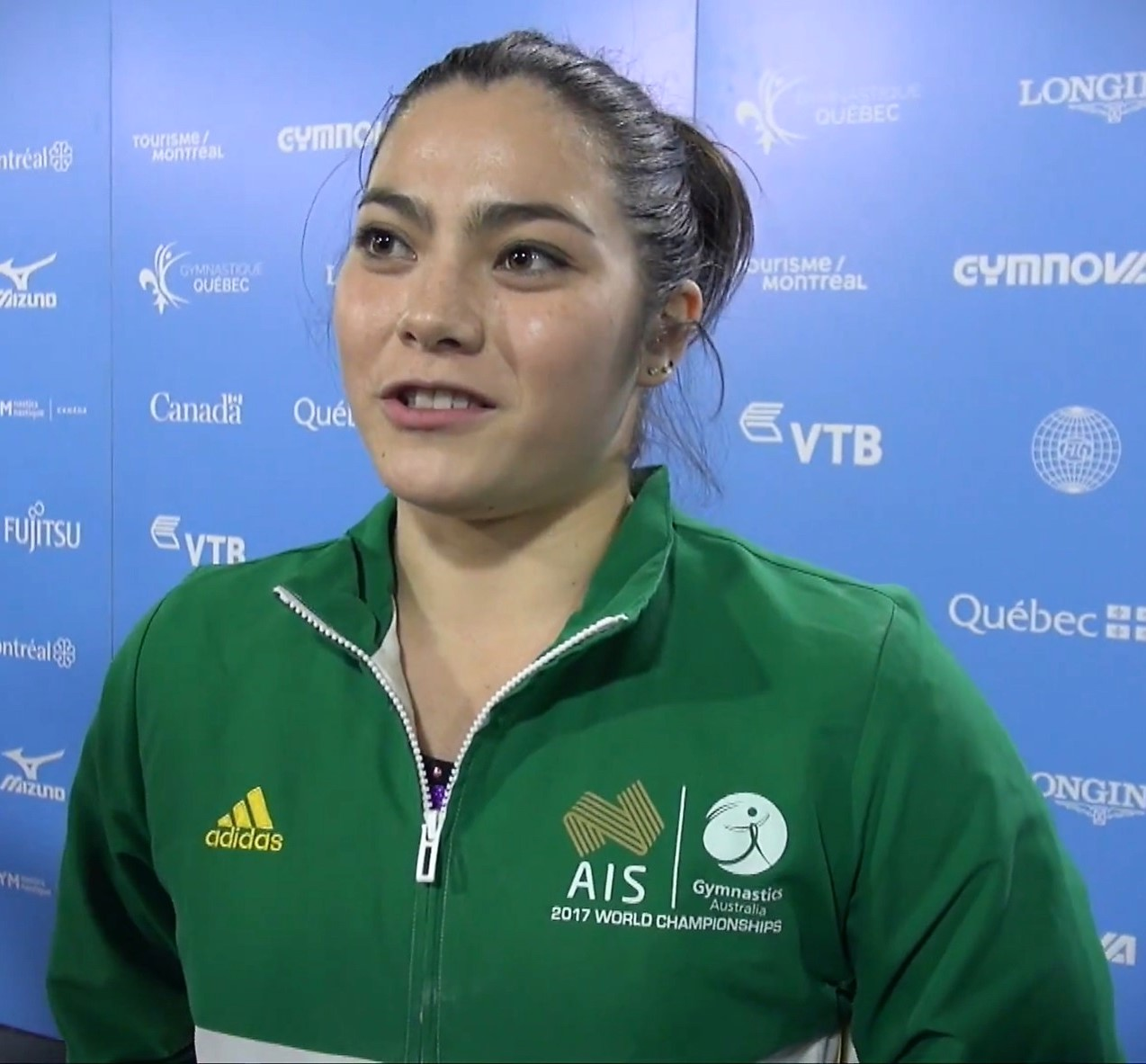
Georgia Godwin

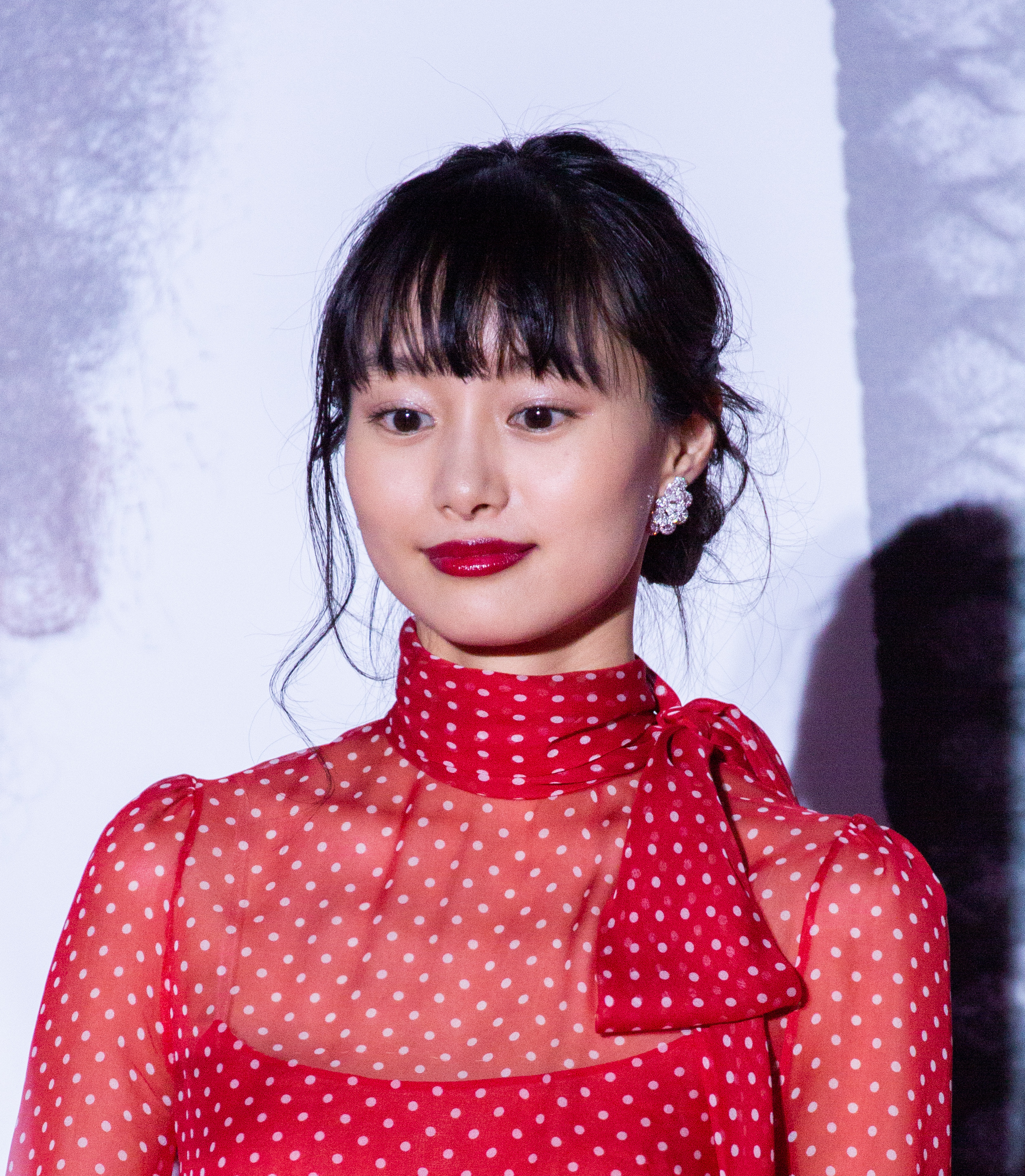
Shioli Kutsuna

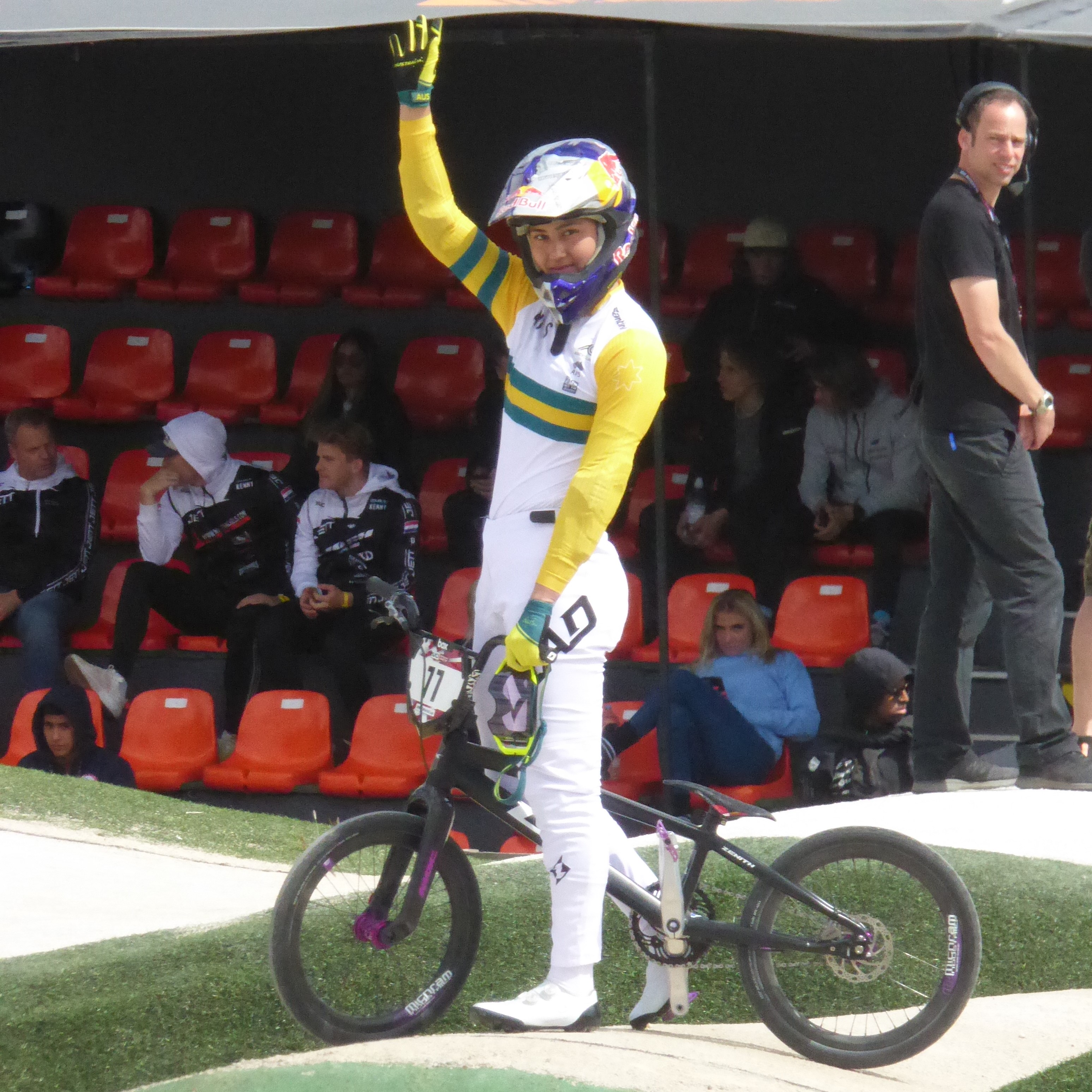
Saya Sakakibara

- Sarah Àlainn: Vocalist, violinist
- Emma Anzai: Bassist for the band Sick Puppies
- Joey Bizinger: YouTuber based in Japan
- Jimmy Chi: Composer, musician and playwright
- Jason Davidson: Australian soccer player
- Alan Davidson: Former Australian soccer player
- Alex Davies: Australian rules footballer
- Georgia Godwin: Gymnast
- Tai Hara: Actor, model and presenter
- Amy Harvey: Singer and member of the J-pop group XG
- Rinky Hijikata: Professional tennis player
- Takaya Honda: Actor and television presenter
- Akira Isogawa: Fashion designer
- Eddie Jones: Former Australian rugby union coach
- Shioli Kutsuna: Actress, model
- Last Dinosaurs: Band members Sean Caskey, Lachlan Caskey, and Dan Koyama
- Rob Lucas: Treasurer of South Australia (1997–2002, 2018–2022)
- George "Joji" Miller: Musician and Internet celebrity
- Nagi Maehashi: Author, cook and business owner
- Sen Mitsuji: Actor
- Yūko Miyamura: Voice actress, best known for voicing Asuka Langley Soryu in Neon Genesis Evangelion
- Yasukichi Murakami: Inventor
- Michito Owens: Australian rules footballer
- Gehamat Shibasaki: Rugby league player
- Yumi Stynes: Television personality
- Kumi Taguchi: Journalist and newsreader for the ABC
- Arisa Trew: Skateboarder
- Shu Uchida: Voice actress
- Tando Velaphi: Soccer player
- Tetsuya Wakuda: Chef
- Sean Wroe: Runner
- Masa Yamaguchi: Actor, stunt performer
- Erika Yamasaki: Weightlifter
- Nina Oyama: Actress, comedian
- Saya Sakakibara: BMX athlete
- Kai Sakakibara: BMX athlete
- Kasumi Takahashi: Rhythmic gymnast

== Gallery ==
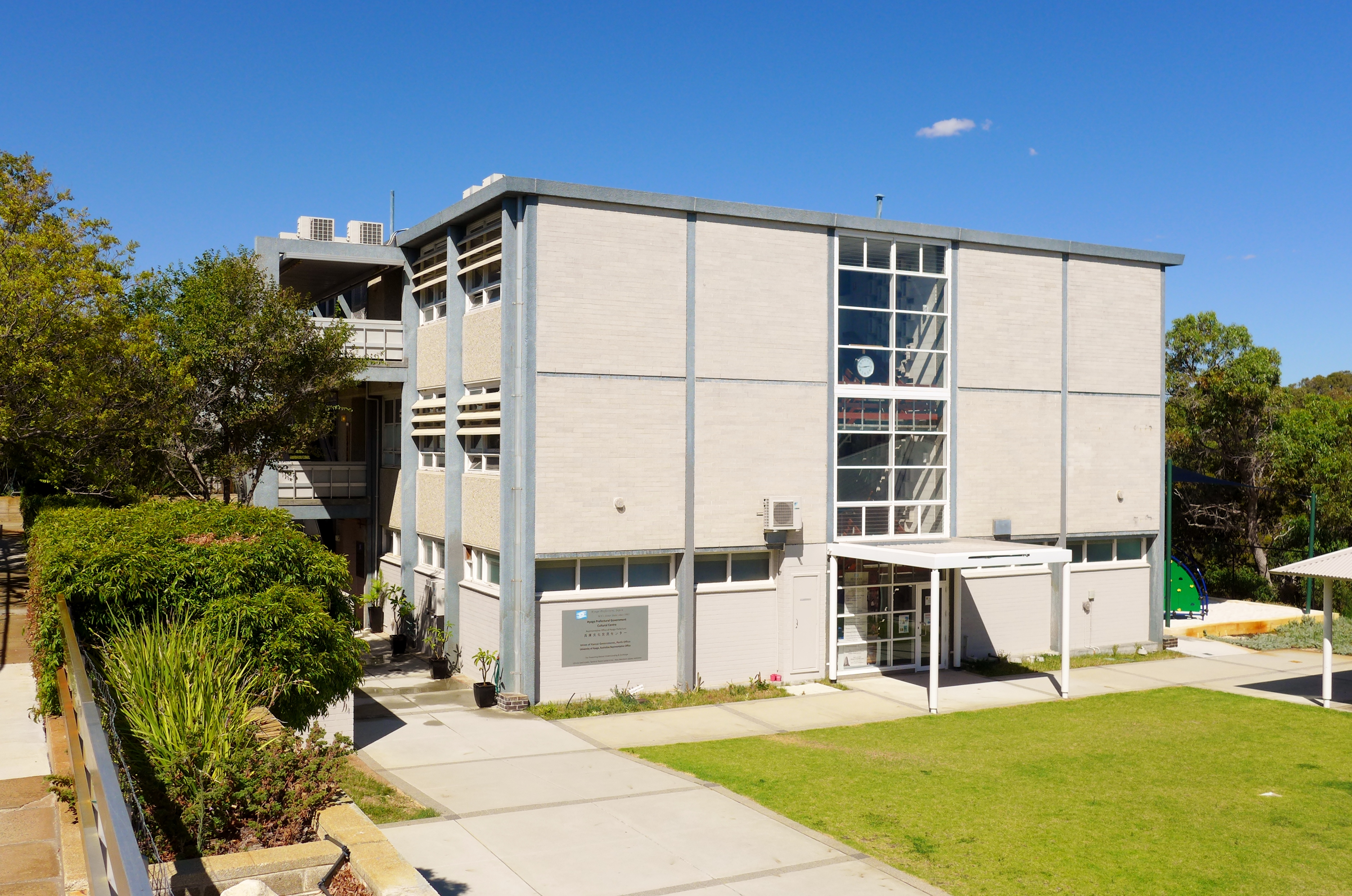
Hyogo Prefectural Government Cultural Centre in Perth

== See also ==
- Asian Australians
- Australia–Japan relations
- Australians in Japan
- Japanese community of Melbourne
- Nichigo Press, Australia's longest established Japanese language newspaper
