= Japanese community of Melbourne =

There is a Japanese community residing in Melbourne, Victoria, Australia. It includes expatriates, other temporary residents, and Japanese Australians.

== Geography ==
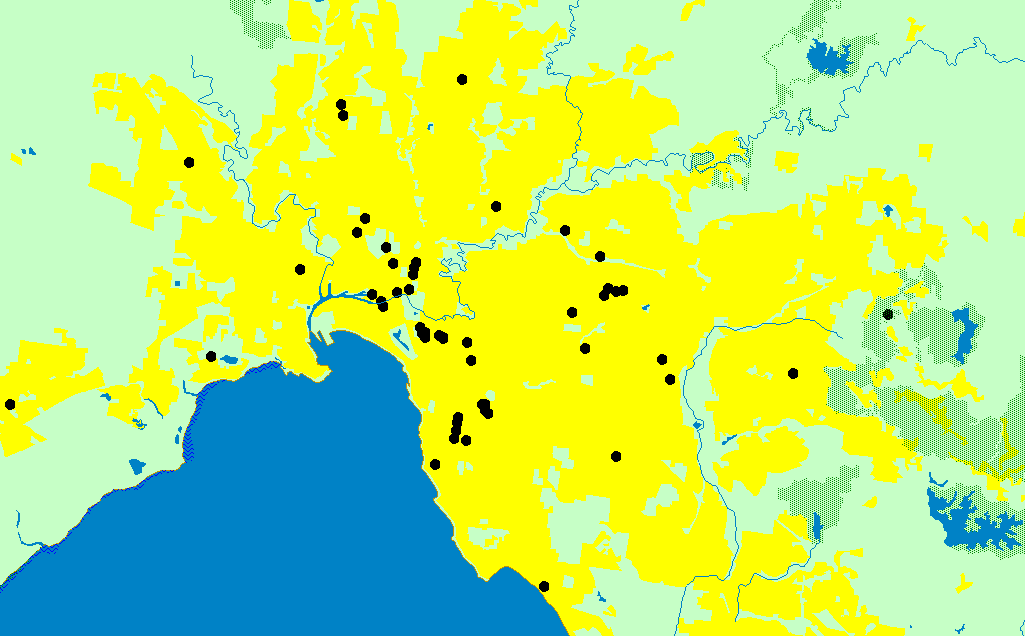
one dot denotes 100 Japan born Melbourne residents

The Japanese population is located throughout the Melbourne area, with many temporary Japanese residents living in middle-class suburbs.

As of 2007, many high income Japanese live in Melbourne-area middle class suburbs, such as Brighton and Camberwell. Camberwell North had 110 persons born in Japan in 1996 and 116 Japan-born persons in 2001. Camberwell South had 116 Japan-born persons in 1996 and 96 Japan-born persons in 2001. Several Japanese families settled in the area around Caulfield due to the location of The Japanese School of Melbourne (JSM), which had been established in 1986. There were nine temporarily located Japanese families in Caulfield South in 1987, and the Japanese population increased after that point due to the school. As of 2007, the neighbourhood of Prahran had many young Japanese persons, and the neighbourood of Toorak had many single Japanese corporate employees.

== Institutions ==
The Japanese Chamber of Commerce and Industry, Melbourne Inc. (JCCiM; メルボルン日本商工会議所 Meruborun Nihon Shōkōkai Gisho), the Japanese Society of Melbourne (JSM; メルボルン日本人会 Meruborun Nihonjinkai), and the Japanese school are the major institutions of Melbourne's Japanese community. In September 1963 the JCCiM was established. In July 1965 the Japanese Society of Melbourne was established. The Japan Club of Victoria (JCV; ヴィクトリア日本クラブ Vikutoria Nihon Kurabu) is the city's largest organization of Japanese migrants. The Japanese government operates the Consulate-General of Japan in Melbourne (在メルボルン日本国総領事館 Zai Meruborun Nippon-koku Sōryōjikan).

== Education ==
The Japanese School of Melbourne (JSM), a nihonjin gakkō (full-time Japanese school), serves the Japanese temporary expatriate community in Melbourne. In September 1972 a full Saturday only Japanese program opened in the city. At one time Japanese officials asked for permission for the establishment of a Japanese school when the Premier of Victoria had approached them to discuss the possibility of further Japanese investment in Victoria, and the JSM full-time school opened on 13 May 1986. There are temporary Japanese expatriates in Melbourne who prefer to send their children to Australian day schools even though Melbourne has a Japanese day school.

The Melbourne International School of Japanese, a supplementary Japanese school, is held at Oakleigh South Primary School in Oakleigh South. It serves levels kindergarten through senior high school. The JSM was formed out of the previous supplementary school, so a new supplementary program opened to replace it. The MISJ first opened in 1986.

In 1996, 400 children of ages 6–15, the ages for elementary and junior high school, lived in Melbourne. About 75% went to Australian schools and the remainder went to the JSM. At the time some Japan-born children attended Australian schools and were moved to a nihonjin gakkō for their final year in Australia, since they were due to return to Japan.

There is a primary school, Caulfield Primary School in Caulfield, with a bilingual English-Japanese program. In 2019, admissions were limited to those in its catchment zone.

== Recreation ==
Tetsuo Mizukami (水上 徹男 Mizukami Tetsuo), the author of The Sojourner Community: Japanese Migration and Residency in Australia, wrote that the chamber of commerce, the JSM, and the Japanese society are "always involved" in major events, such as festivals and athletic competitions, related to the Japanese community, and that the said community "becomes quite visible in Melbourne" when these events take place.

The Japan Festival is held in the City of Whitehorse. Mizukami stated on 26 October 1997 there were over 300 Japanese persons who participated at the Japanese athletic competition in Fawkner Park, making the competition one of the Japanese community's largest activities.
