= Japan–New Zealand relations =

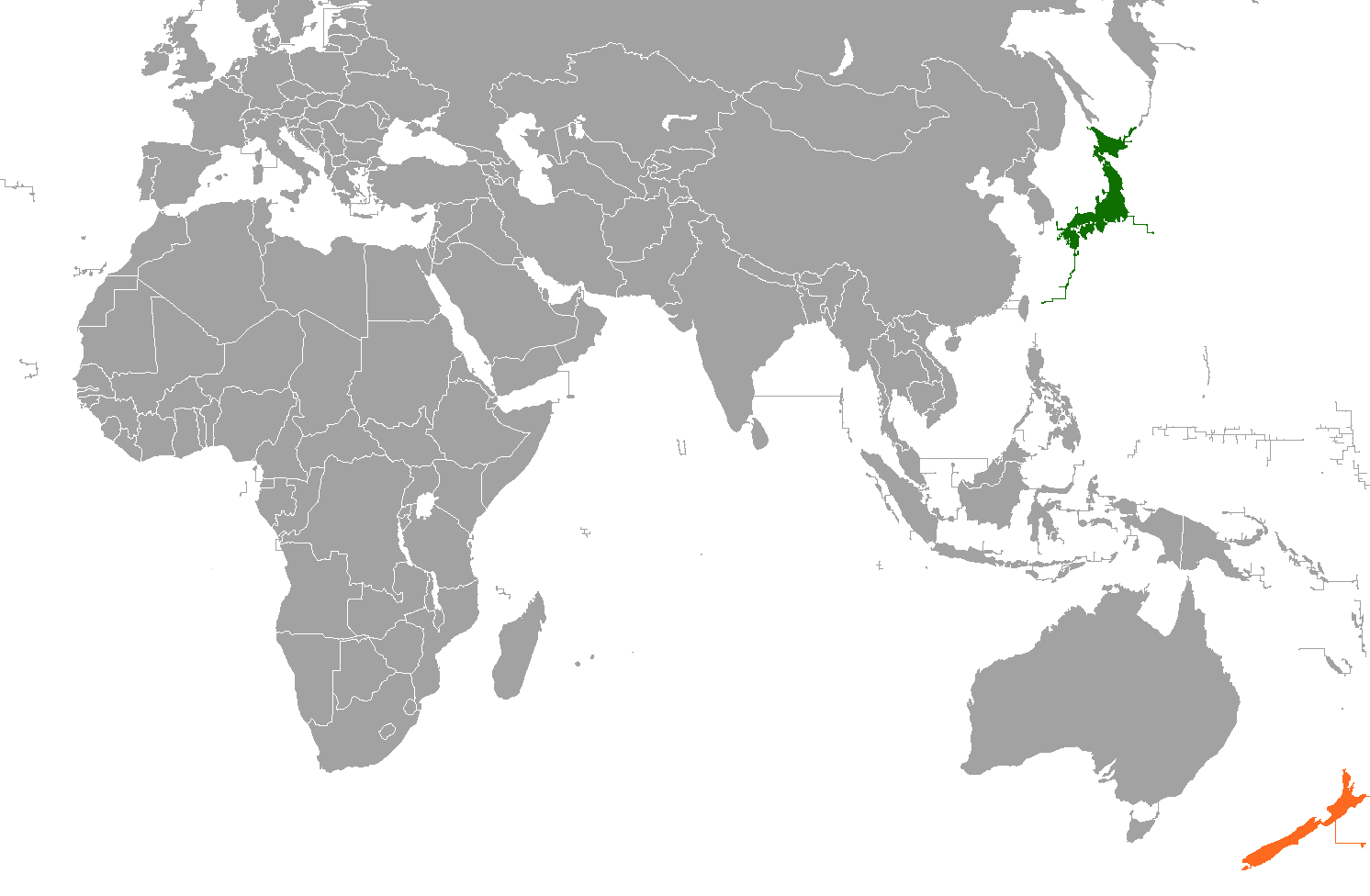

- Japan: New Zealand

Diplomatic mission
- Embassy of Japan, Wellington: New Zealand Embassy, Tokyo

Envoy
- Japanese Ambassador to New Zealand Kōichi Itō: New Zealand Ambassador to Japan; Hamish Cooper

Japan–New Zealand relations are the bilateral diplomatic relations between Japan and New Zealand. Both countries grew from initial military engagement to extensive economic cultural, and diplomatic ties, with Japan becoming a major trading partner and New Zealand experiencing increased tourism and cultural exchange from 1960s onwards. Early interactions were sharped by New Zealand's involvement in a post-war occupation (J Force) and its subsequent economic relationship with a rising Japan. Later, New Zealand evolving into a stable partnership with Japan, characterized by cultural and social exchanges, established societies, and sister city relationships.

Both relationships are generally warm and have since continued to grow strong over the years. Both nations are being considerably close, substantial, and driven by mutual interests, with both nations having a close ties with Western world including Australia. Japan is one of major economic partners with New Zealand, for example: It is New Zealand's "major trading partner and an increasingly important source of capital investment". In recent times, both relations have expanded beyond strong economic and commercial links to other spheres, including culture, tourism, defense, and scientific cooperation.

Tensions were high in the early stage of relationship between Japan and New Zealand, such as the Great Depression of 1930s and Asia-Pacific War in World War II (1941–45). After the war, New Zealand participated in a post-war occupation of Japan through J Force, a contingent of soldiers overseeing the repatriation of Japanese citizens. Seven years later, they formally founded a diplomatic relations in 1952. Following the war, New Zealand's economic partnership with Japan transformed from a modest exchange of wool to Japan becoming a key trading partner by the early 1960s. This period marked a significant development in New Zealand's non-Anglo-Saxon economic relationships. In 1958, Japan signed a trade treaty with New Zealand as a part of its global resumption of normal trading relations. The post-war period oversaw the arrival of Japanese wives of New Zealand serviceman, though they initially faced challenges with residency and cultural assimilation. From the 1960s through 1980s, the rapid growth of a mature relationship has been eventually stabilized, which leading to a more balanced and enduring connection between the two countries.

In cultural and social connections, from the 1960s onward, cultural exchanges increased through initiatives like 1964 Tokyo Olympic Games and New Zealand's Expo '70 in Osaka, fostering a growing connection between the both nations. The establishment of Japan–New Zealand societies, sister city relationships, and the presence of Japanese businesses, brands, and tourists in New Zealand, which deepened these connections. 1960s saw the introduction of Japanese language courses in New Zealand schools, universities, and colleges, and aspects of Japanese culture, such as ikebana (flower arrangement) and with pottery and porcelain, gained popularity.

Japan's perceived economic domination during the early 1980s and 1990s. However, New Zealand government and business leaders see Japanese politics and lawmakers as a vital export market and an essential element in New Zealand's future growth and prosperity in Asia-Pacific region. Japan, for its part, regards New Zealand as an important partner, a reliable source of energy, minerals and other primary products, a popular tourist destination, a useful conduit to the West, and the only other middle-ranking economic power in Asia-Pacific and around the world. Both countries acknowledge each other as key strategic partners within both members of Asia-Pacific Economic Cooperation, with both being prosperous liberal democracies and key allies with the United States of America, Mexico, Canada, Australia, and among other nations. Both nations began formal negotiations for an information security agreement, which would be facilitate sharing more classified information. Then-New Zealand Prime Minister Jacinda Ardern described Japan as a "key partner" in the region; for his part, then-Japanese Prime Minister Fumio Kishida described the relationship as the linchpin of security in the Indo-Pacific.

New Zealand maintains an embassy in Tokyo. Japan maintains an embassy in Wellington, and a consulate-general in Auckland.

== History ==
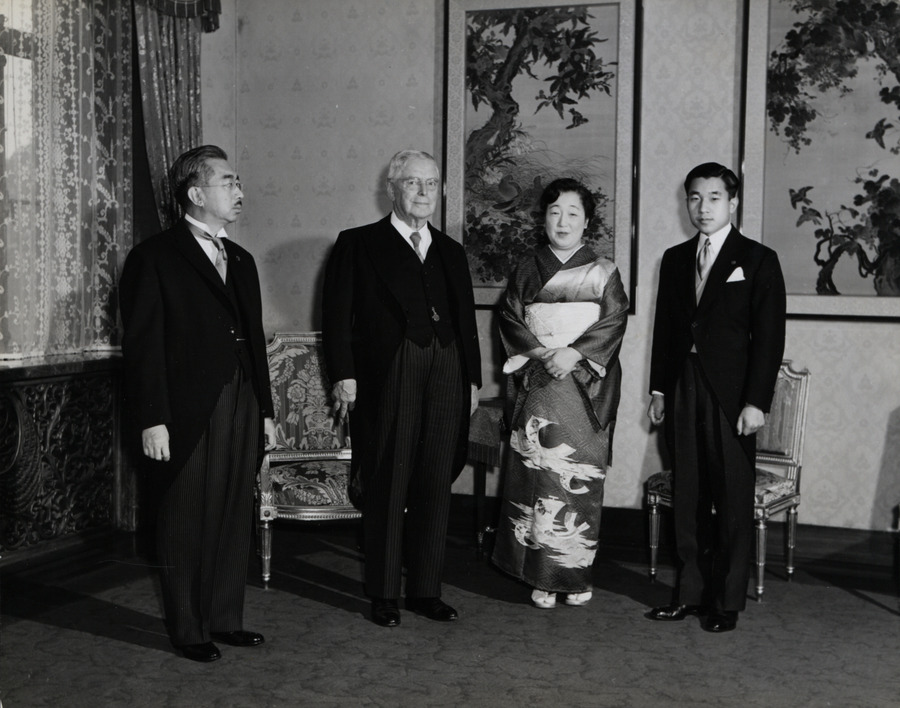
Then-New Zealand Prime Minister Walter Nash (left) met with Emperor Hirohito (1901–1989) (second left), Empress Nagako (1903–2000) (right), and then-Crown Prince Akihito (second right), 20 February 1959.

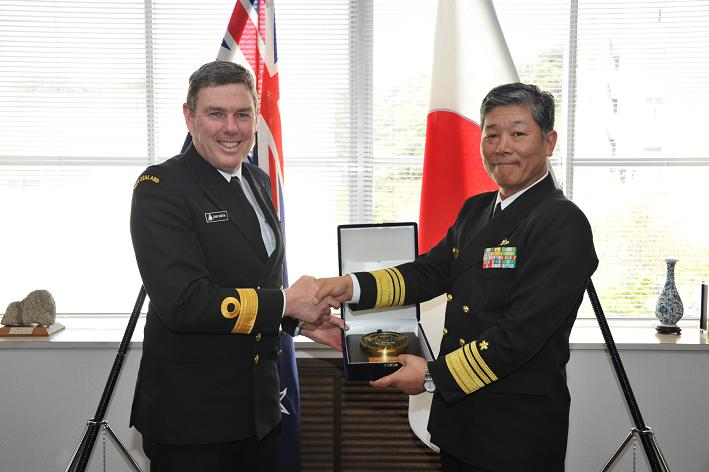
Commodore John Martin, RNZN (left) and Vice Admiral Yasushi Matsushita, JMSDF at the Yokosuka headquarters near Tokyo on 15 October 2012.

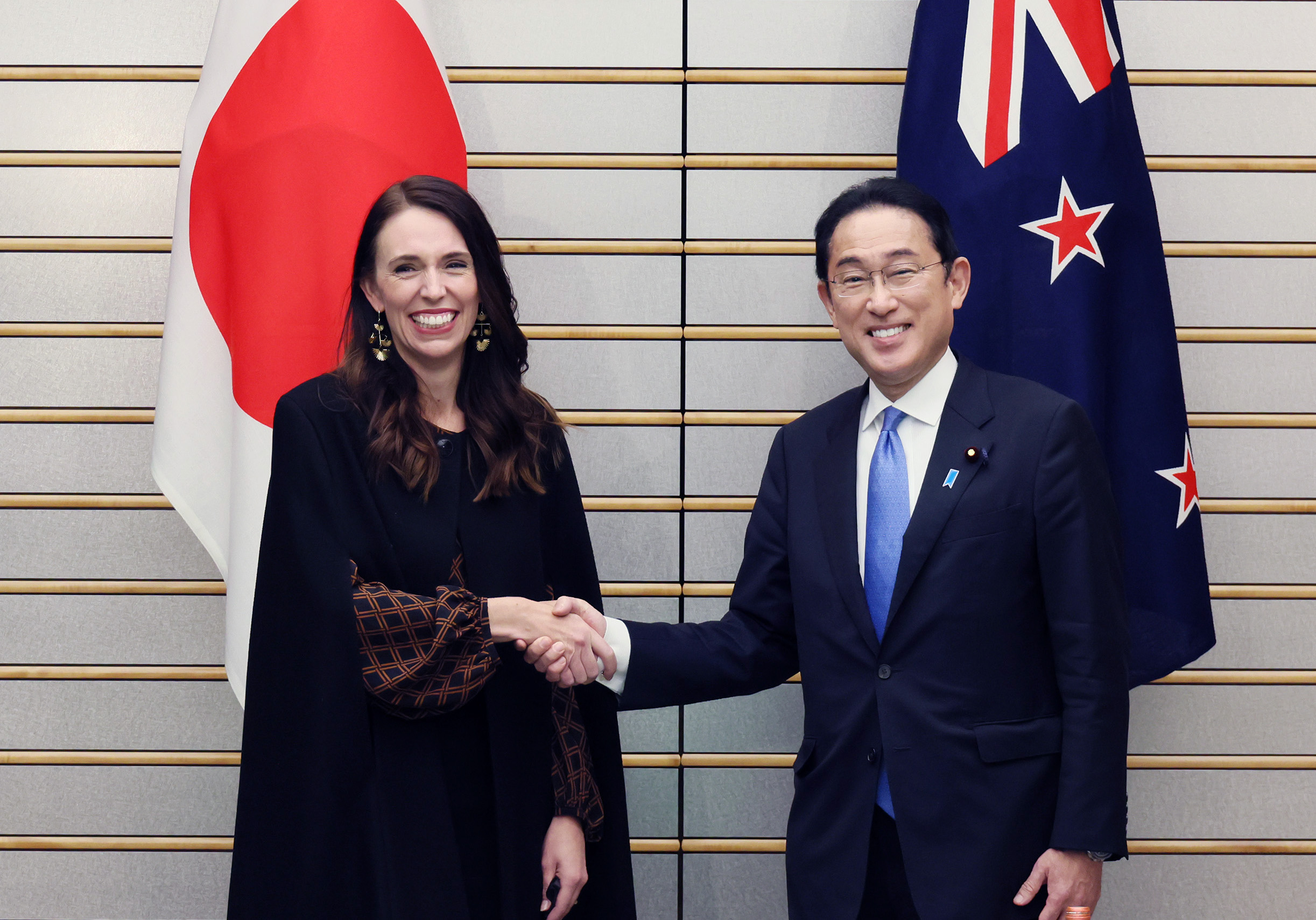
Then-Japanese Prime Minister Fumio Kishida meets with then-New Zealand Prime Minister Jacinda Ardern in Tokyo, 21 April 2022.

Initial contact between Japan and New Zealand was via London as New Zealand was a part of British Empire. In 1898, Arthur Stanhope Aldrich was appointed as an honorary consul in New Zealand after retiring from a career in the Japanese civil service. In 1928, while New Zealand was a self-governing dominion within the British Empire, Japan and New Zealand signed a provisional arrangement concerning commerce, customs and navigation. Japan opened a consulate in Wellington in 1938 but this closed in 1942 after Japan entered World War II. During World War II, New Zealand forces fought against Japan, primarily in Singapore, the Solomon Islands and in the waters surrounding Japan. Towards the end of the war, in 1944, New Zealand warships HMNZS Achilles and HMNZS Gambia bombarded the Japanese coast. The war in the Pacific soon ended after the American atomic bombings of Hiroshima and Nagasaki in August 1945. New Zealand troops known as J Force occupied Japan after the war to help with clean-up and reconstruction.

New Zealand and Australia both favoured a harsh treaty with Japan after 1945. However Australia's fear of a Japanese threat was greater, while New Zealand regarded Europe as the most likely area of future conflict. However, when Washington desired a softer approach to Japan, New Zealand and Australia both wanted American guarantees for their security. The U.S. did this with the three-way ANZUS Pact signed in San Francisco in September 1951 before the peace conference opened.

In 1952, New Zealand and Japan established diplomatic relations and that same year, New Zealand opened a diplomatic legation in Tokyo. The following year, Japan opened a legation in Wellington. In 1955, Prime Minister Sidney Holland became the first New Zealand head of government to pay an official visit to Japan. The visit was reciprocated in 1957 by Japanese Prime Minister Nobusuke Kishi. In 1958 the two nations signed a commercial treaty that began their modern economic relationship. New Zealand showed little interest in trade with Japan in the 1950s. However it feared losing its British market for agricultural products. It was clear that with mainland China under hostile Communist control more trade with Japan would be wise.

Since 1958, Japan and New Zealand have developed strong political ties with common views and a shared interest in the stability, growth, and development of the Asia-Pacific region. In April 2012, both nations celebrated 60 years of diplomatic relations.

In July 2021, despite the COVID-19 pandemic spreading worldwide, many New Zealand Olympic teams were travelled to Japan during 2020 Summer Olympics. As a result, New Zealand team collected a total of 20 medals: 7 gold, 6 silver, and 7 bronze, at these Games, surpassing the record of 18 gained at the 2016 Summer Olympics.

== High-level visits ==
High-level visits from Japan to New Zealand

- Prime Minister Nobusuke Kishi (1957)
- Prime Minister Hayato Ikeda (1963)
- Prime Minister Eisaku Satō (1967)
- Prince Mikasa and Princess Mikasa (1971)
- Crown Prince Akihito and Crown Princess Michiko (1973)
- Prime Minister Kakuei Tanaka (1974)
- Prime Minister Masayoshi Ōhira (1980)
- Prince Akishino (1980)
- Prince Katsura (1982)
- Prime Minister Yasuhiro Nakasone (1985)
- Prime Minister Kiichi Miyazawa (1993)
- Prime Minister Ryutaro Hashimoto (1997)
- Prime Minister Keizō Obuchi (1999)
- Crown Prince Naruhito and Crown Princess Masako (2002)
- Prime Minister Junichiro Koizumi (2002)
- Crown Prince Naruhito and Princess Masako (2002, 2006)
- Prime Minister Shinzō Abe (2014)

High-level visits from New Zealand to Japan

- Prime Minister Sidney Holland (1955)
- Prime Minister Walter Nash (1959)
- Prime Minister Keith Holyoake (1960, 1965, 1968, 1970)
- Prime Minister Robert Muldoon (1976, 1981)
- Prime Minister Geoffrey Palmer (1990)
- Prime Minister James Bolger (1995, 1996)
- Prime Minister Jenny Shipley (1998, 1999)
- Prime Minister Helen Clark (2001, 2005, 2008)
- Prime Minister John Key (2009, 2010, 2011, 2012, 2015)
- Prime Minister Bill English (2017)
- Speaker of the House of Representatives Trevor Mallard (2018)
- Governor-general Patsy Reddy (2019)
- Prime Minister Jacinda Ardern (2019, 2022)

== Bilateral agreements ==
Both nations have signed several bilateral agreements such as a Provisional Arrangement concerning Commerce, Customs and Navigation (1929); Agreement on Commerce (1958); Agreement on the Avoidance of Double Taxation and the Prevention of Fiscal Evasion with Respect to Taxes on Income (1963); Agreement concerning Reciprocal Waiving of Passport Visas and Passport Visa Fees (1970); Agreement on Fisheries (1978); Agreement on Air Services (1980) and an Agreement on Working Holiday Visas (1985).

== Tourism and transportation ==
In 2014, 81,000 Japanese citizens visited New Zealand for tourism. That same period, over 41,000 New Zealanders visited Japan for tourism. There are direct flights between Japan and New Zealand with Air New Zealand.

== Trade ==
In 2016, trade between Japan and New Zealand totalled US$6.4 billion. Japan's main exports to New Zealand include motor vehicles and electronic goods. New Zealand's main exports to Japan include timber, aluminium, dairy (especially cheese), kiwifruit and beef. The timber trade between New Zealand and Japan is considered so important to the production of wood products in the latter that the timber export sheds at Wellington’s port were, for a long time, adorned with Ukiyo-e portraits of Kabuki actors.

== Multilateral organizations ==
Both nations are members of Asia-Pacific Economic Cooperation, Australia Group, Comprehensive and Progressive Agreement for Trans-Pacific Partnership, Organization for Economic Cooperation and Development, United Nations, International Monetary Fund, World Trade Organization, and among others. Australia and Japan were also part of Trans-Pacific Partnership, for the boost of Indo-Pacific cooperation.

== Resident diplomatic missions ==
- Japan has an embassy in Wellington, a consulate-general in Auckland and a consular office in Christchurch.
- New Zealand has an embassy in Tokyo.
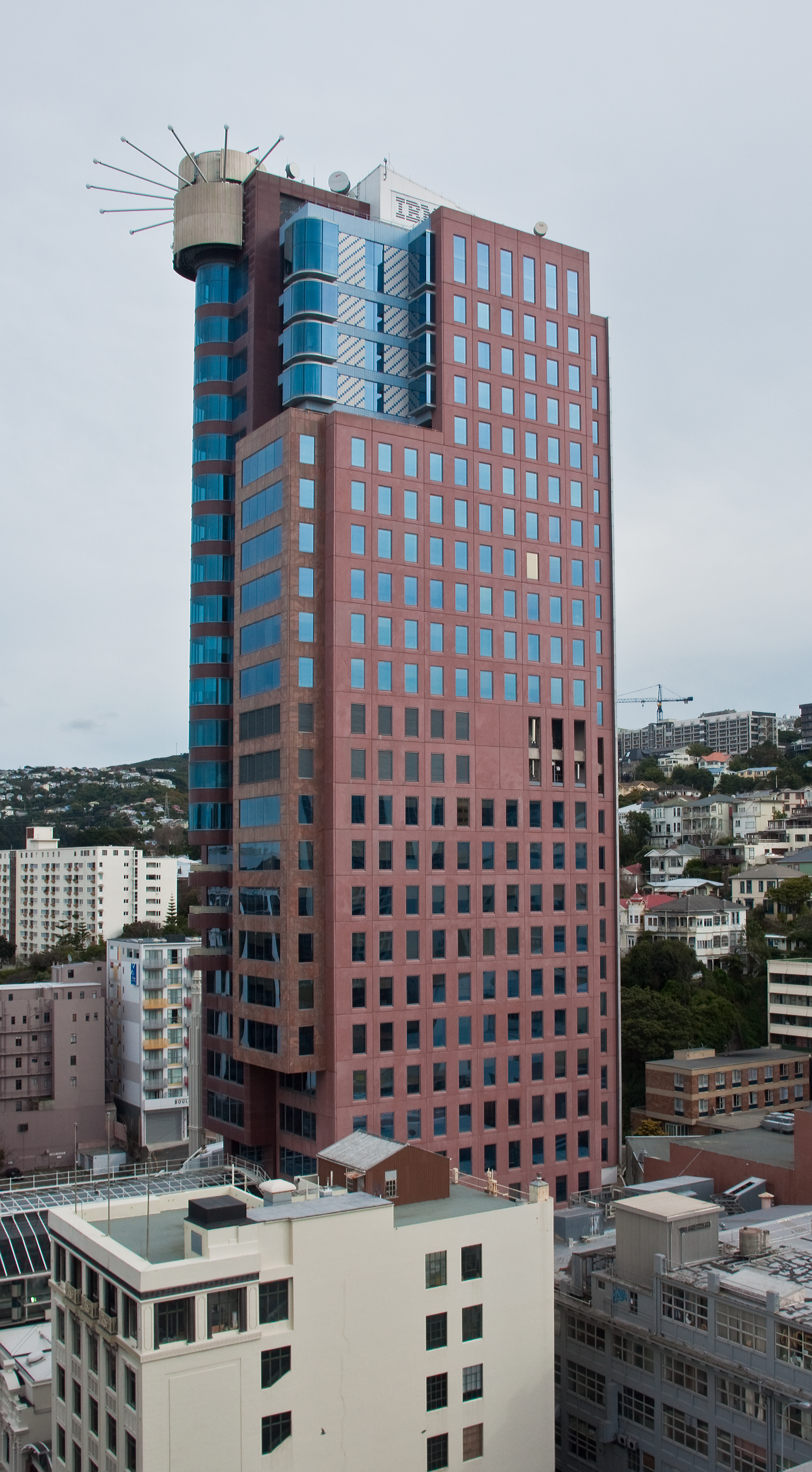
Building hosting the Embassy of Japan in Wellington

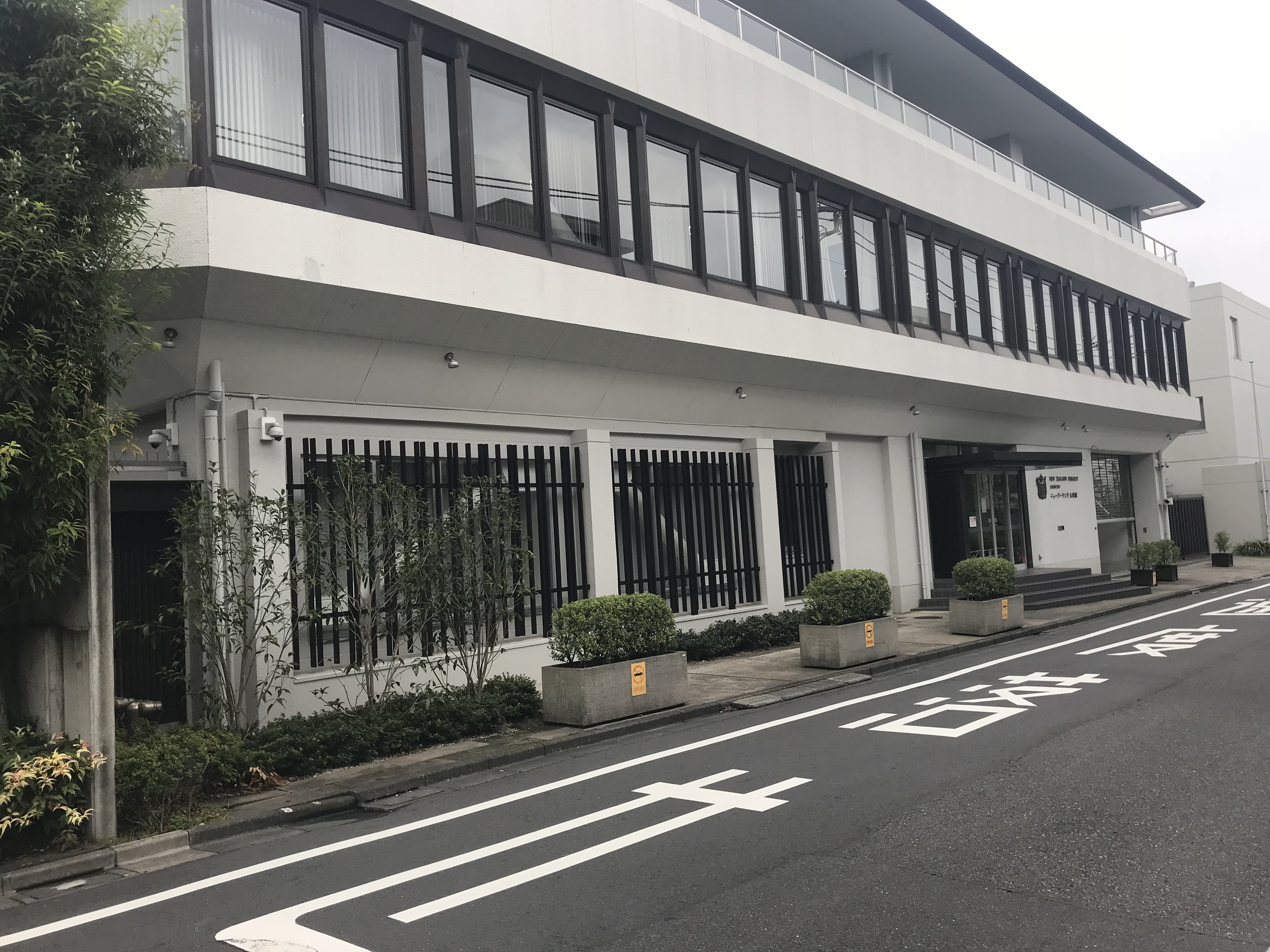
Embassy of New Zealand in Tokyo

== See also ==
- Foreign relations of Japan
- Foreign relations of New Zealand
- New Zealanders in Japan
- Japanese New Zealanders
