= Japanese New Zealanders =

Ethnic group

日系ニュージーランド人

Total population
- 19,488

Regions with significant populations
- Auckland, Christchurch, Wellington

Languages
- English, Japanese

Religion
- 73.7% No religion 9.9% Christianity; 8.2% Buddhism

Related ethnic groups
- Japanese diaspora, Japanese Australians

Japanese New Zealanders (日系ニュージーランド人, Nikkei Nyūjirando-jin) are New Zealand citizens of Japanese ancestry, which may include Japanese immigrants and descendants born in New Zealand. Japanese people first began immigrating to New Zealand in the 1890s. Until 1920, 14 Japanese citizens resided in New Zealand. Japanese immigration was halted during the period of the Pacific War and recommenced around the 1950s. From this period onwards, Japanese immigration remained small until the 1990s. In 1997, Japanese peoples were the 19th-largest ethnic group in New Zealand. As of the 2023 census, 19,488 New Zealand residents identify themselves as Japanese New Zealanders.

== Demographics ==
In the 2023 census, 19,488 New Zealand residents identified themselves as members of the Japanese ethnic group. Of this number, the median age was 28.9 years. Females made up the majority (11,985), compared to males (7,405). Historians note that the higher proportion of women can be attributed to a larger number of Japanese women in mixed relationships with New Zealand citizens than Japanese men. Japanese women are also more likely to move to New Zealand for working holiday or study purposes. Auckland had the largest population of Japanese residents (44.9%), followed by Canterbury (18.2%) and Otago (6.2%). 63.5% of residents of Japanese ethnicity belonged to only one ethnic group; 28.8% belonged to two ethnic groups. 34.9% of Japanese residents were born in New Zealand, while 65.1% were born overseas. 93.2% of these overseas born residents were born in Asia. In the 2013 census, 10,269 residents were born in Japan.

In the 2023 census, 90.1% of residents of Japanese ethnicity spoke English, while 58.9% spoke two languages. Most residents of Japanese ethnicity held no religious affiliation (75.3%); 6.6% identified as Buddhist, 9.2% identified as Christian, and 2.7% identified as belonging to other religious groups, beliefs or philosophies.

The most common professions for Japanese in New Zealand were professionals (23.0%), community and personal service workers (16.7%) and technicians and trade workers (13.4%). 43.6% of Japanese in New Zealand reported full-time employment.

== History ==
Japanese immigration to New Zealand first began in the 1890s. The first Japanese settler, Asajiro Noda, arrived at Bluff in the South Island. One of the first Japanese nationals to become a citizen of New Zealand was Kazuyuki Tsukigawa in 1907. Prior to the beginning of Japanese immigration to New Zealand, most who arrived from Japan were short term visitors for diplomatic or cultural exploration reasons. New Zealand maintained strict immigration policies on non-European immigrants from the late 19th century to the early 20th century. Exceptions included Japanese who were married to or had parents who were New Zealand residents.

During the Meiji Restoration of Japan, beginning in 1868, opportunities for exploration of Western nations including New Zealand were introduced, following the end of Japan's 250-year policy of seclusion. In 1874, some of the first Japanese visitors to New Zealand included a Japanese circus troupe. From 1882 to 1930, Japanese naval ships made visits to New Zealand, offering tours of the ships to New Zealanders.

In 1920, 14 Japanese citizens resided in New Zealand. During this period, 10 Japanese immigrants had so far chosen to take up New Zealand citizenship. In 1931, the first Japanese student to study in New Zealand arrived.

As more Japanese visitors and immigrants began to arrive, so too did Japanese trade and business. While immigration increased, there was still hesitation from some white New Zealanders towards the influx of Asian immigration. Japanese people typically chose to adopt English names upon immigrating to New Zealand to integrate.

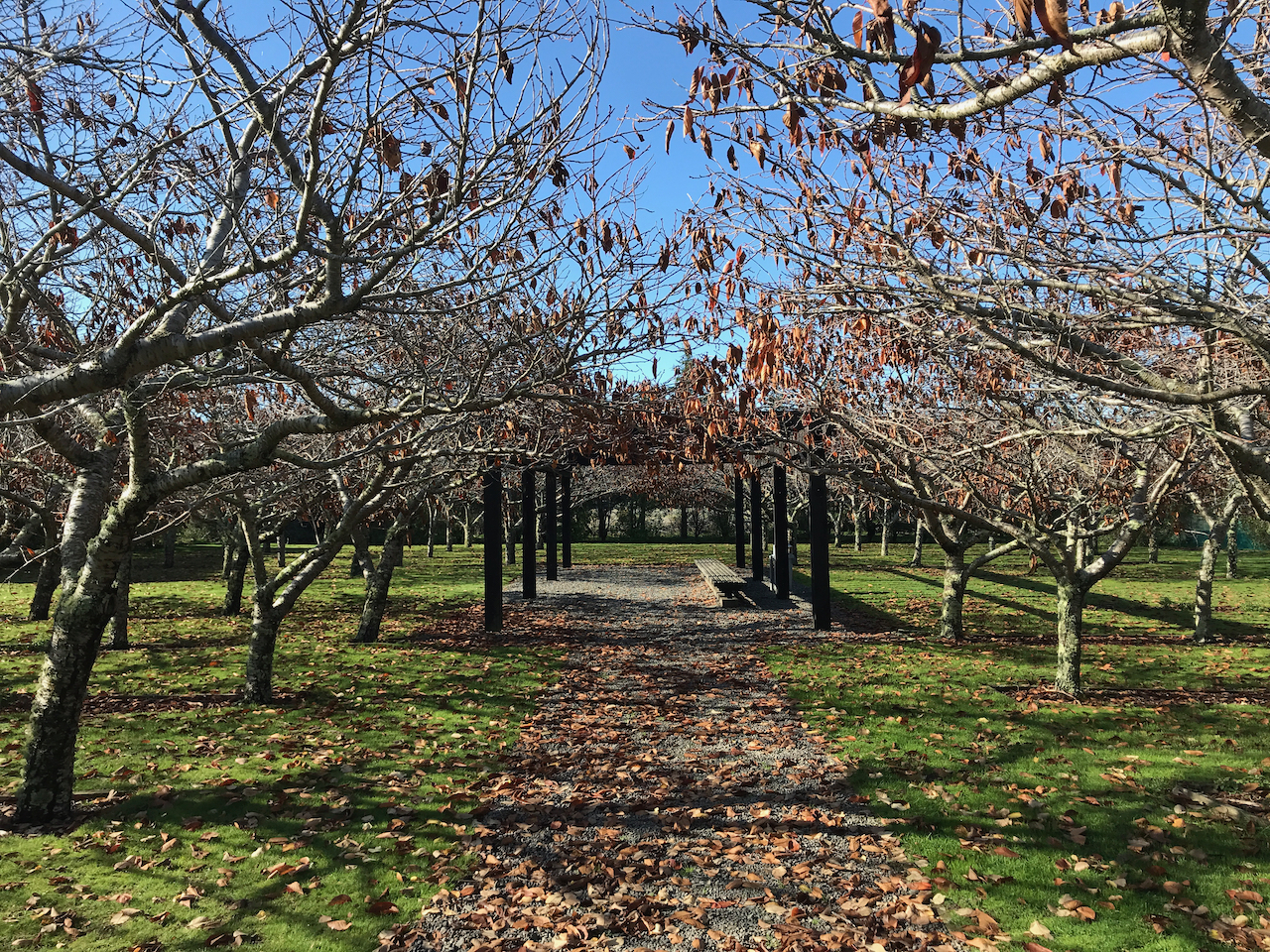
Featherston Memorial Garden

Upon Japan's entry into World War II, Japanese immigration and tourism began to slow. Japanese businesses and institutions such as the Japanese Consulate closed their doors, as hostility towards Japanese immigrants mounted. Following the bombing of Pearl Harbour, Japanese immigrants were typically imprisoned on Somes Island, or at a prisoner of war camp in Featherston. In 1942, 8,000 Japanese were interned at Featherston. Several Japanese prisoners of war were killed or wounded in skirmishes at these camps. A strike against forced labour at Featherston on 25 February 1943 resulted in the deaths of 48 Japanese prisoners and one guard. A joint memorial garden between Japan and New Zealand now stands at the site.

A diplomatic relationship between Japan and New Zealand was re-established in 1952. Relationships were re-established and Japanese culture became a major export of interests to New Zealand.

During the 1950s and 1960s, a group of 50 Japanese women emigrated to New Zealand as Japanese war brides. These women had fallen in love with New Zealand soldiers who were stationed in Japan as part of the Occupational Forces post-World War II. These women faced difficulties in adjusting to life in New Zealand, including a lack of local community pressure to assimilate, and disapproval from their families for having married foreigners and moved away.

== Immigration and tourism ==
Japanese immigration to New Zealand remained low until the 1990s. Between 1976 and 1986, the number of Japanese residents in New Zealand increased from 1,245 to 1,791 people. Prior to 1980, there were no established Japanese migrant communities in New Zealand. Until this period, only small numbers of Japanese citizens were admitted into New Zealand. During the mid-1990s, working holiday schemes were opened for Japanese citizens in New Zealand as a result of reformed immigration policies. Immigration policies began to promote the immigration of Japanese citizens with skilled job qualifications. This led to an increase in younger professionals arriving as short-term immigrants. The introduction of new immigration opportunities led to a large increase in Japanese immigration to New Zealand. Japanese communities, supplementary schools, societies and businesses developed.

Between 1991 and 2001, the Japanese population in New Zealand increased from 2,970 people to 10,000 people, 3.4 times the size of the Japanese population in 1991. In 1997, those of Japanese ethnicity made up 0.21% of New Zealand's population. Academics also attribute this rapid increase in population size to the expansion of tourism and education for Japanese citizens from the late 1980s. The Immigration Act of 1991 can also be credited for the increase in Japanese immigration. The Act led to an increase in immigrants of various ethnicities and backgrounds, with a more multicultural view of immigration.

In 1997, 162,736 Japanese tourists visited New Zealand, constituting 10.5% of New Zealand's annual visitors. Japanese immigration has continued to rise since the 1990s, with a population of 19,488 in 2023. This steady increase is often credited to the Westernisation of Japanese culture, as well as the globalisation of European New Zealander culture. This has made it easier for Japanese people to acclimate to life in New Zealand. Historians also note that a large reason for Japanese immigration to New Zealand is familial ties, such as spouses, partners or immediate family of New Zealand descent. In 1997, 56.3% of Japanese applicants for permanent residency in New Zealand applied under the Family category.

== Geographic placement ==
Large groups of Japanese communities can be found in the cities of Auckland, Christchurch, Wellington, and Dunedin.

=== Auckland ===
The majority of Japanese New Zealanders reside in Auckland. In 1997, 41.8% of Japanese residents lived in Auckland. Japanese immigration to Auckland began because of short-term business expatriates transferred primarily to Japanese company locations in Auckland. The immigration of these short-term business expatriates led to the creation of a wider Japanese community in Auckland. Located in Auckland is the Auckland Japanese Supplementary School, the New Zealand-Japan Society of Auckland, and the Auckland Japanese Christian Church. Japanese New Zealanders in Auckland typically reside in the Eastern suburbs. Many short-term Japanese residents in Auckland have created smaller Japanese enclaves within Auckland.

=== Christchurch/Canterbury ===
The Japanese community of Christchurch developed an informal community in the 1980s. In 1992, the Japanese Society of Canterbury was created, with the aim of assisting Japanese immigrants in integrating into New Zealand society, and providing cultural and social opportunities. The Society also distributes a quarterly newspaper, The Japanese Society of Canterbury Newspaper. The newspaper is also utilised by the Japanese Government to communicate with Japanese New Zealanders. In 1997, 21% of Japanese citizens in New Zealand resided in Canterbury. As of 2013, 2,568 Japanese residents resided in Canterbury.

=== Wellington ===
In 2013, 1,164 Japanese residents lived in Wellington. The city once housed a Japan Seamen's Hall, which was a recreational hall for Japanese fishermen and sailors while in port in Wellington. Currently, Wellington also hosts an annual 'Japan Festival Wellington'. The festival celebrates the relationship between Japan, Wellington and Wellington's Japanese sister city, Sakai. Located in Wellington is the Japanese Society of Wellington, which promotes Japanese culture in New Zealand. Also in Wellington is the 'Sangatsu-kai choir', with at least 60 members. The choir acts as a support system for Japanese New Zealanders. The group is also involved in cultural events within Wellington.

=== Hawke's Bay ===
Hawke's Bay is home to the Japan Society of Hawke's Bay. The society was founded in 1961 after a local resident decided to form a community group between locals and Japanese immigrants. The society runs Japanese culture focused events, as well as Japanese Conversation classes.

== Education ==
Locations of hoshū jugyō kō in New Zealand; blue dots represent schools with teachers sent from Japan, while green dots represent schools without teachers from Japan

Japanese-language schools were first established in New Zealand to allow the children of Japanese business expatriates the opportunity to continue learning the Japanese school curriculum while living in New Zealand. Full-time Japanese curriculum schools and part-time Japanese supplementary schools were opened. The first supplementary school was opened in 1972 in Auckland. The students attended both local schools and supplementary schools to be able to integrate into the Japanese system once they returned to Japan. Originally, only the children of business expatriates were permitted entry; however, as demand grew, permanent residents were allowed entry.

The study of the Japanese language is also a popular choice in languages in New Zealand. A 1993 survey found that 27,942 people were studying Japanese in New Zealand. At the time, New Zealand had the seventh-highest number of people studying Japanese in the world. Japanese language courses were introduced to New Zealand's secondary and tertiary education systems in 1960.

There are weekend supplementary Japanese education programmes (hoshū jugyō kō) in Auckland, Canterbury/Christchurch, and Wellington. Japanese schools within New Zealand include:

- Canterbury Japanese Supplementary School (カンタベリー日本語補習校, Kantaberii Nihongo Hoshūkō) – Ilam School, Ilam, Christchurch
- Auckland Japanese Supplementary School (オークランド日本語補習学校, Ōkurando Nihongo Hoshūgakkō)
- Japan-New Zealand Joint Venture School (ウェリントン補習授業校, Werinton Hoshū Jugyō Kō) – Crofton Downs, Wellington

== Cultural impact ==
The end of World War II marked the beginning of New Zealand's interest in the major exportation of Japanese culture. Since this period, the Japanese community of New Zealand has expanded to include formalised communities, organisations and cultural institutions. Examples include the Japanese Society of Canterbury, which opened in 1991.

There are currently 14 New Zealand-Japan societies and 32 sister cities. These organisations and communities were formed to provide a bridge between Japanese New Zealander's Japanese heritage and their lives in New Zealand. Ayami Kuragasaki-Laughton writes that Japanese New Zealanders have "dual loyalty to the land of their birth and the place where they live."

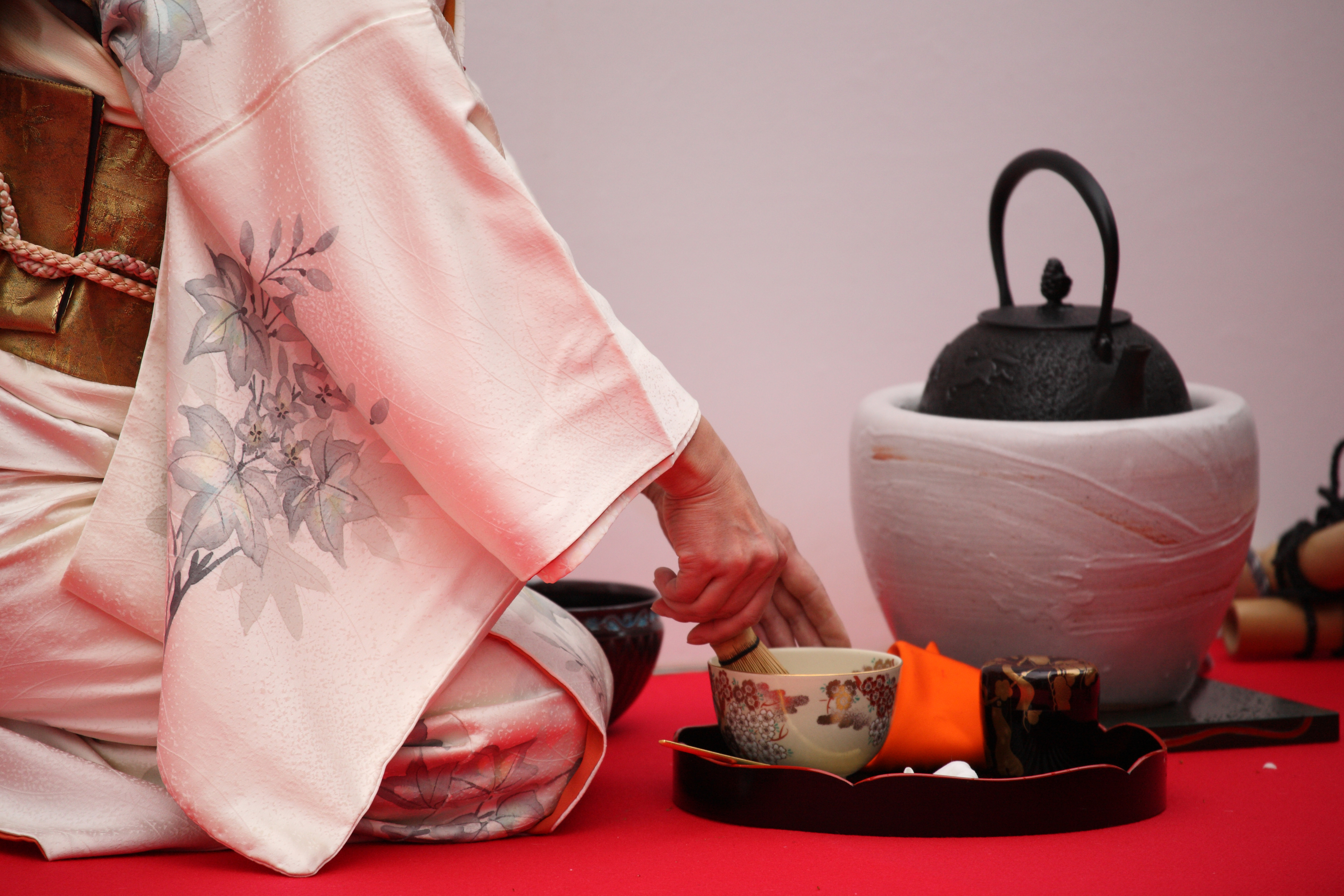
Japanese tea ceremony

Japanese New Zealander community-run organisations often host clubs aimed at introducing Japanese culture to New Zealand. The New Zealand-Japan Society of Auckland hosts Aoteakai, a Japanese tea ceremony club, and Haere Mai, a taiko performance group.

Traditional art styles in New Zealand have also been influenced by Japanese traditions. New Zealand pottery techniques have been influenced by Japanese potters such as Shōji Hamada, who was one of several potters who made visits to New Zealand from Japan.

Ikebana became popular in New Zealand during the 1960s and 1970s. Introduced during cultural visits by Japanese experts, it led to the creation of ikebana societies in New Zealand, such as Ikebana Wellington.

Japanese popular culture such as manga and anime have also become popular in New Zealand, especially through younger generations. New Zealand hosts an annual anime and manga convention called Overload, a major event for New Zealand anime and manga fans featuring local and international artists. Retailers within the country have started selling manga and merchandise related to popular anime, video games and Japanese brands. A community of cosplayers and cosplay enthusiasts has also developed in New Zealand due to the growing popularity of Japanese popular culture.

J-pop has a dedicated following in New Zealand. On 15 November 2024, the Japanese virtual idol Hatsune Miku performed live at Spark Arena in Auckland as part of a debut Miku Expo concert tour in New Zealand and Australia, attracting thousands of enthusiasts including cosplayers and Vocaloid fans who travelled from around New Zealand and overseas to attend the event.

Japanese forms of martial arts are a popular cultural export in New Zealand. Between 2007 and 2008 around 70,000 people in New Zealand practised a martial art. Jujutsu was introduced to New Zealand by touring jujutsu professionals from Japan in the early 1900s, as a form of entertainment.

From the middle of the 20th century, judo became more commonly practised in New Zealand. Clubs for judo and karate in New Zealand were first created in the 1950s. A National Judo Championship was held in New Zealand in 1957. The first National Karate Championship was held in New Zealand in 1967. Over time, Westernised styles of Japanese martial arts have been created in New Zealand. Traditional forms of martial arts continue to gain popularity as well.

== Notable Japanese New Zealanders ==
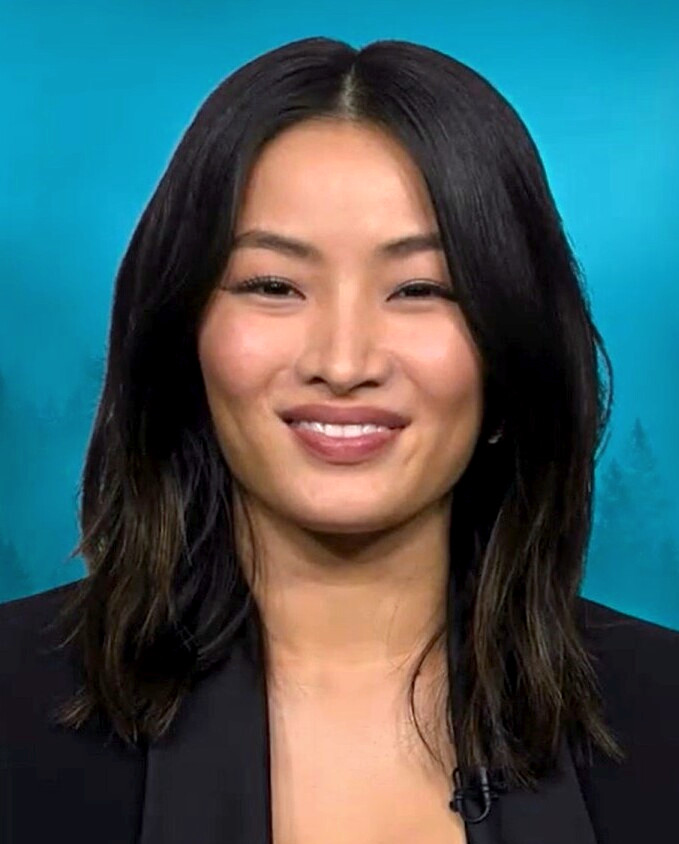
Anna Sawai

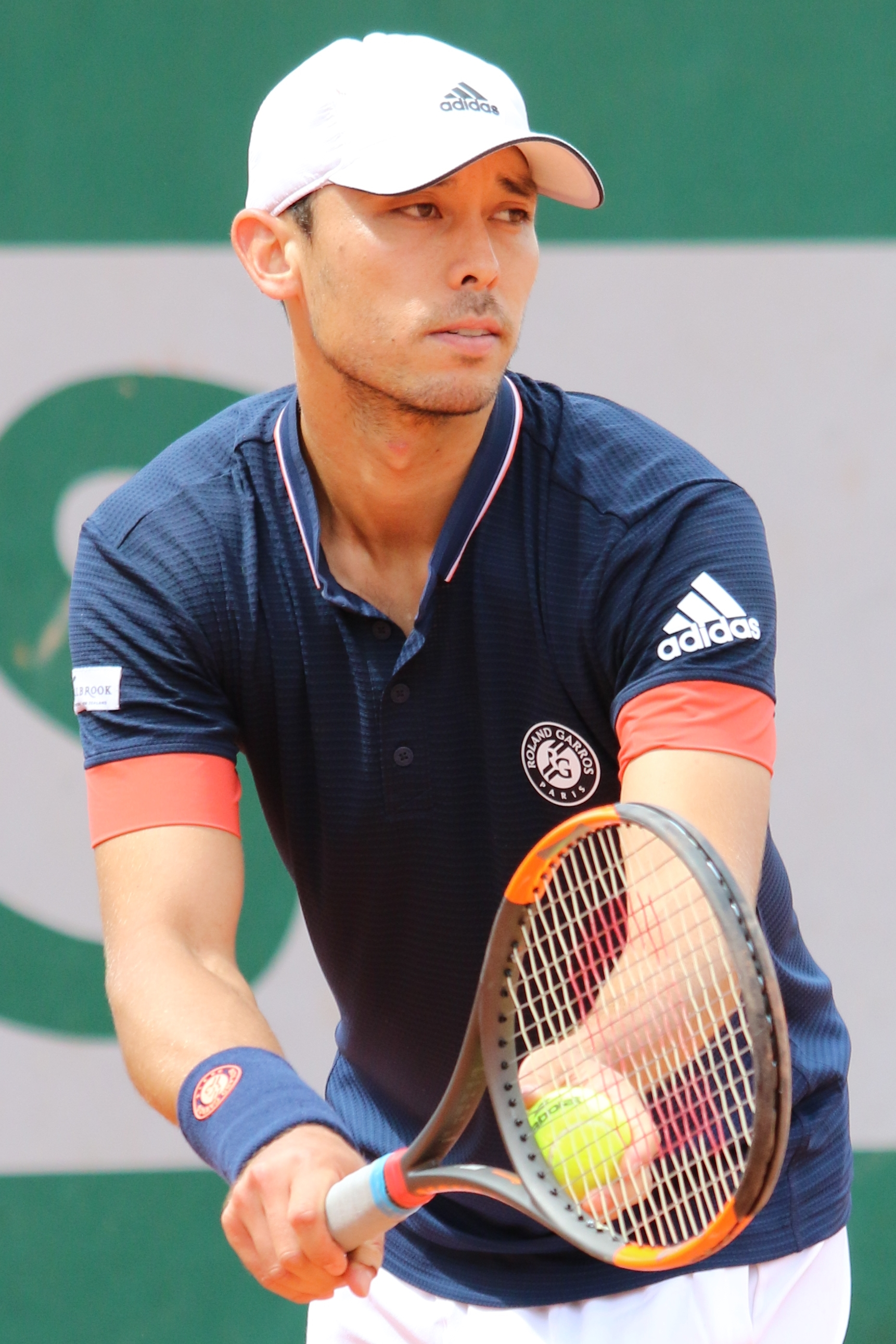
Ben McLachlan

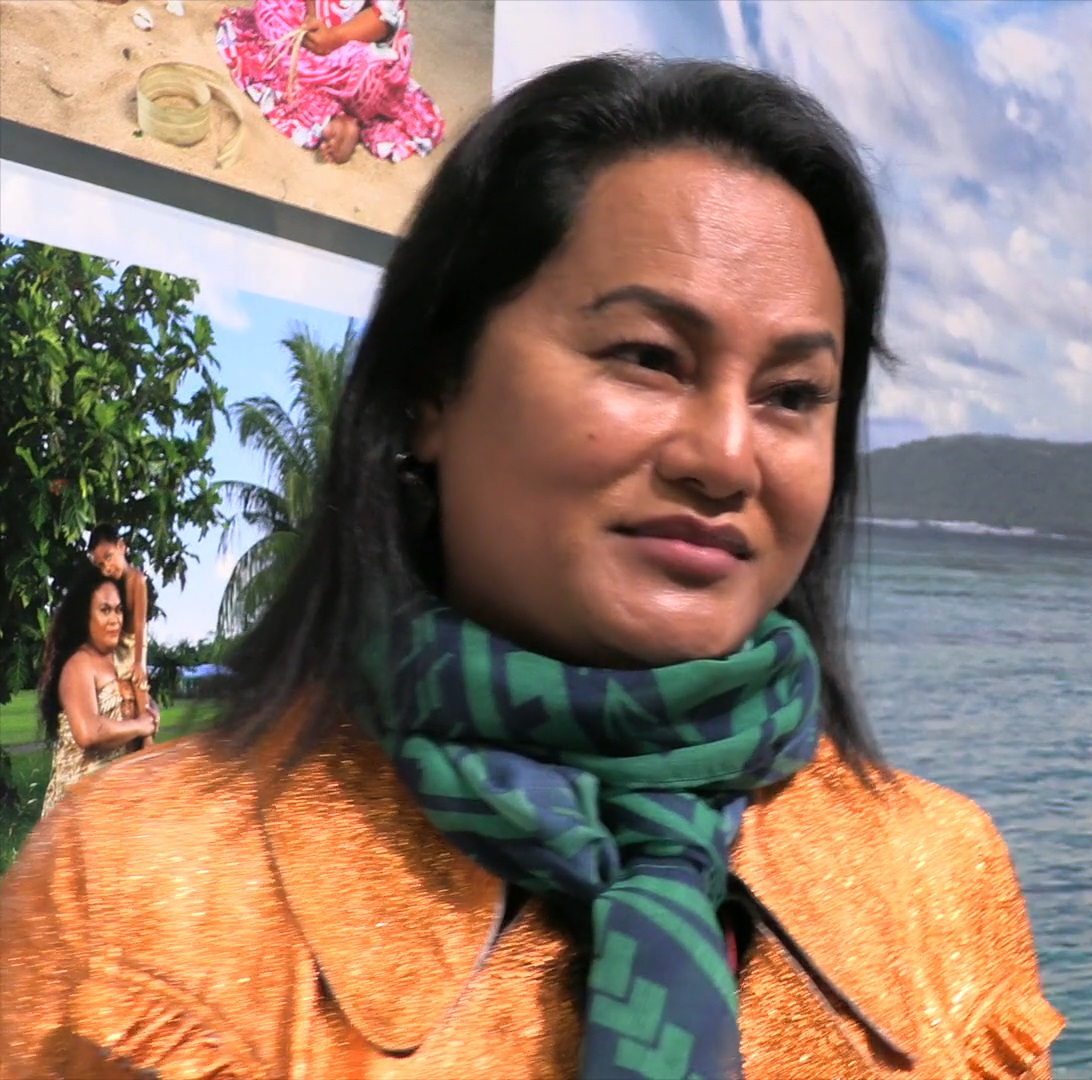
Yuki Kihara

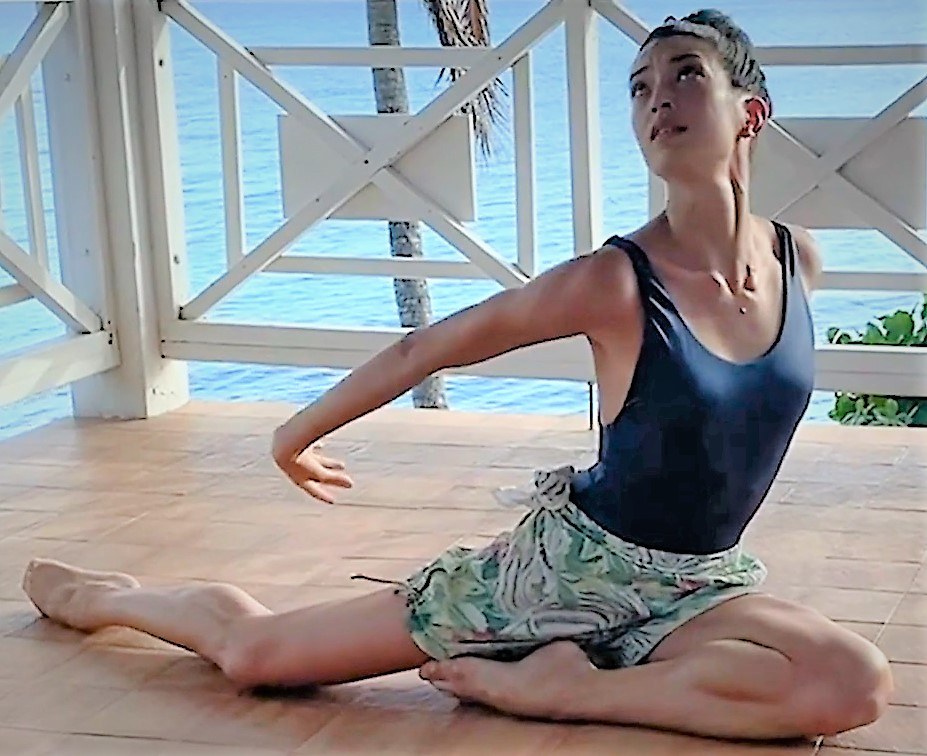
Hannah O'Neill

- Michael Fitzgerald, professional footballer
- JAY'ED, singer-songwriter
- Shigeyuki Kihara, artist
- Ben McLachlan, professional tennis player
- Kazuyuki Kiyohei Tsukigawa, mariner and Salvation Army officer
- Kayne Vincent, professional footballer
- Anna Sawai, actress, dancer and singer, former member of Faky
- Nicole Fujita, model and tarento
- Mark de Clive-Lowe, DJ, musician, composer and producer
- Hannah O'Neill, ballet dancer
- Asajiro Noda, first Japanese migrant to New Zealand

== See also ==
- Immigration to New Zealand
- New Zealanders in Japan
- Japan–New Zealand relations
- Japanese diaspora
- Japanese Australians
