= New Zealanders in Japan =

在日ニュージーランド人

Total population
- 4,212 (In December, 2025)

Related ethnic groups
- Australians in Japan

New Zealanders in Japan (Japanese: 在日ニュージーランド人, Hepburn: Zainichi Nyūzīrando-jin) comprise New Zealand citizens residing in Japan. In December 2025, there were 4,022 resident New Zealanders in Japan. This figure does not include individuals naturalised as Japanese citizens, short-term residents, or Japanese people with New Zealand ancestry who do not hold New Zealand citizenship. Japan does not allow its citizens over 18 to have dual citizenship.

Tokyo, Hokkaido, Osaka and Kanagawa have the largest populations of New Zealanders.

== See also ==
- Japan–New Zealand relations
- New Zealand diaspora
- Immigration to Japan
- Japanese New Zealanders
