= Australians in Japan =

Ethnic group in Japan

Total population
- 13,776 (In December, 2025)

Languages
- Australian English; Japanese

Related ethnic groups
- New Zealanders in Japan, Britons in Japan

Australians in Japan comprise Australian citizens residing in Japan. In December 2025, there were 13,776 resident Australians in Japan. This figure does not include individuals naturalised as Japanese citizens, short-term residents, or Japanese people with Australian ancestry who do not hold Australian citizenship. Japan does not allow its citizens over 18 to have dual citizenship.

== Notable Australians in Japan ==
- Richard Court, Australian ambassador to Japan
- Che'Nelle, Malaysian Australian J-Pop singer
- George "Joji" Miller, singer and former comedian
- Shū Uchida, voice actress

== Major population centres ==
Tokyo, Hokkaido, Nagano, Osaka and Kanagawa are major population centres for Australians in Japan.

=== Niseko, Hokkaido ===
Since the early 2000s, a significant Australian community has emerged in the Niseko area of Hokkaido, which comprises the towns of Kutchan, Niseko, and Rankoshi. This is due to the popularity of the region's ski resorts. In 2020, 33.1% of foreign nationals living in Kutchan were Australians. Many Australian settlers have established tourism-related businesses such as guest houses and restaurants, and holiday homes in the area, and the area has been described as a 'Little Australia'.

== See also ==
- Australian diaspora
- Australian rules football in Japan
- Australia–Japan relations
- Japanese Australians
