= Asajiro Noda =

New Zealand seaman, cashier, gum-digger, and farmer

Noda Asajiro
- 野田 朝次郎
- Born: January 17, 1868; Tomioka, Amakusa-Shimo-shima Japan
- Died: July 9, 1942; Batley, New Zealand, Kaipara Harbour, Northland
- Spouse: Rihi Tipene Te Ahu

Asajiro Noda (野田 朝次郎, Noda Asajirō; b.1868–d.1942) was a Japanese New Zealand seaman, cashier, gum-digger and farmer. He is noted as the first Japanese settler in New Zealand.

== Life ==
Noda was born in Japan on 17 January 1868 in a small village, Tomioka on Shimoshima Island, Amakusa to father Kaka Shi Kuishn and mother Noi Kimomo Kena Kuishn. Noda's father was a ship carpenter.

When Noda was 10 years old he accompanied his father who was working on an English vessel in the Nagasaki harbour. Accounts express that Noda was accidentally left on board when the ship sailed. When he was discovered he was put onboard a German ship meant to travel back to Japan, however Noda never returned to Japan.

Sailing the Pacific for a few years, Noda finally disembarked in the New Zealand South Island port of Bluff in Invercargill, sometime in the 1880s-1890s. He first found work in Invercargill as a cashier as he speaking both Japanese, German and English. He later moved to Northland and Waikato where he worked as a kauri gum-digger.

Around 1894, Noda married Rihi Tipene Te Ahu, a Māori woman from Kawhia. They had five children.

After Rihi Tipene Te Ahu passed away around 1918, Noda later married Kathleen Brown (nee Edwards) and lived close to Batley, Maungaturoto.

It is noted that Noda and his family faced prejudice due to their mixed race heritage, with specific difficulty during both World Wars. Noda's son Martin Asajiro Noda made contact with their family in Japan who remembered the young Noda's disappearance. Communication ceased upon Japan's involvement in World War II. Noda and his son were declared 'enemy aliens' and subsequent threats to the war effort. Martin Noda was taken to an internment camp on Matiu Somes Island, Wellington, where he remained for four months. Asajiro Noda was not interned due to his age and declining health.

Asajiro Noda died on 9 July 1942 in Maungaturoto, aged 74. He is buried in the Kakarea Churchyard near the Otamatea Marae.
