= Japanese School in Perth =

School in City Beach, Western Australia

- パース日本人学校

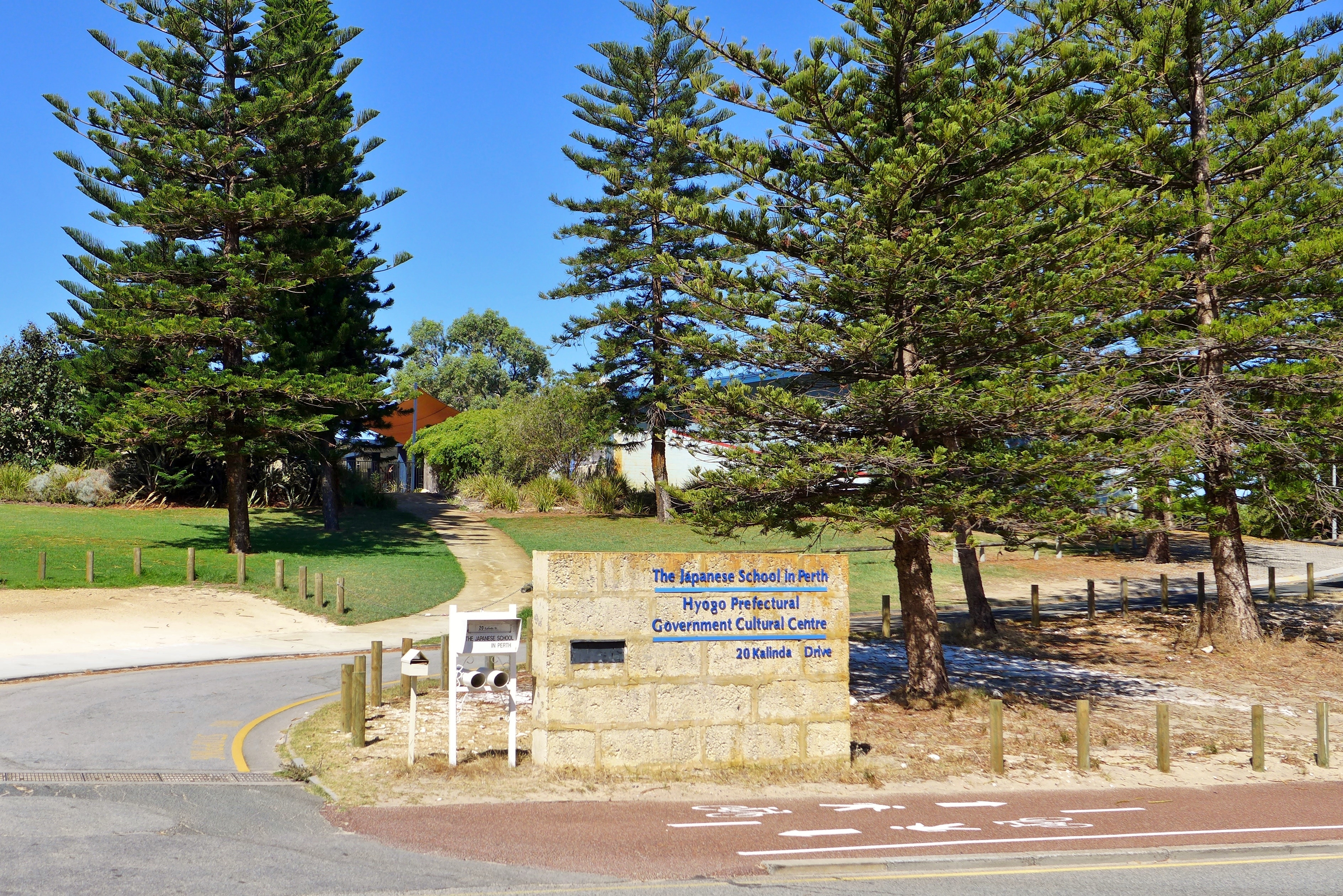
- Entrance of the former site at 20 Kalinda Drive

Location
- 30 Marapana Road; City Beach, 6015; Australia; 31°56′09″S 115°45′54″E

Information
- Type: International school
- Opened: 1978
- Website: jsp.wa.edu.au

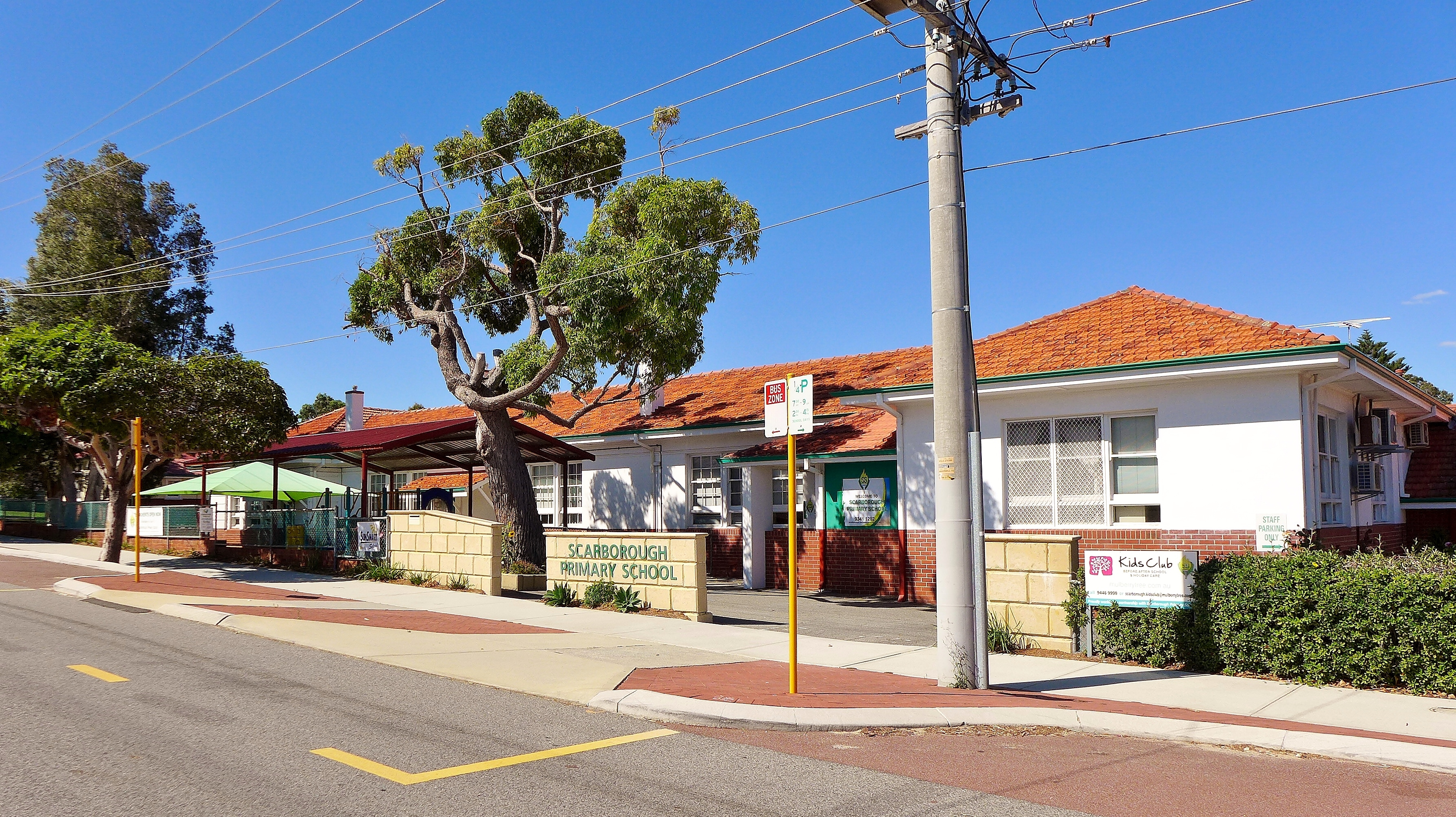
A former school location, Scarborough Primary School

The Japanese School in Perth (パース日本人学校, Pāsu Nihonjin Gakkō), abbreviated to JSP, is a Japanese international school located in City Beach within the Town of Cambridge of Perth, the capital city of Western Australia.

The school opened in 1977. Historically the school was located on the property of a local Australian school, and the two schools had joint activities. Since 1998 the school uses the four term system used by Australian schools.

The school was previously in Scarborough. In its history, up to 2012, the school had moved three times. After Education Minister Peter Collier announced that the school will relocate from its Kalinda Drive location in City Beach, it co-located with City Beach Primary School at Marapana Road in City beach.

== See also ==
- Japanese Australian

Part-time Japanese schools in Australia

- Canberra Japanese Supplementary School
- Melbourne International School of Japanese
- Japanese Language Supplementary School of Queensland
