= Sydney Japanese International School =

- シドニー日本人国際学校; Shidonī Nihonjin Kokusai Gakkō

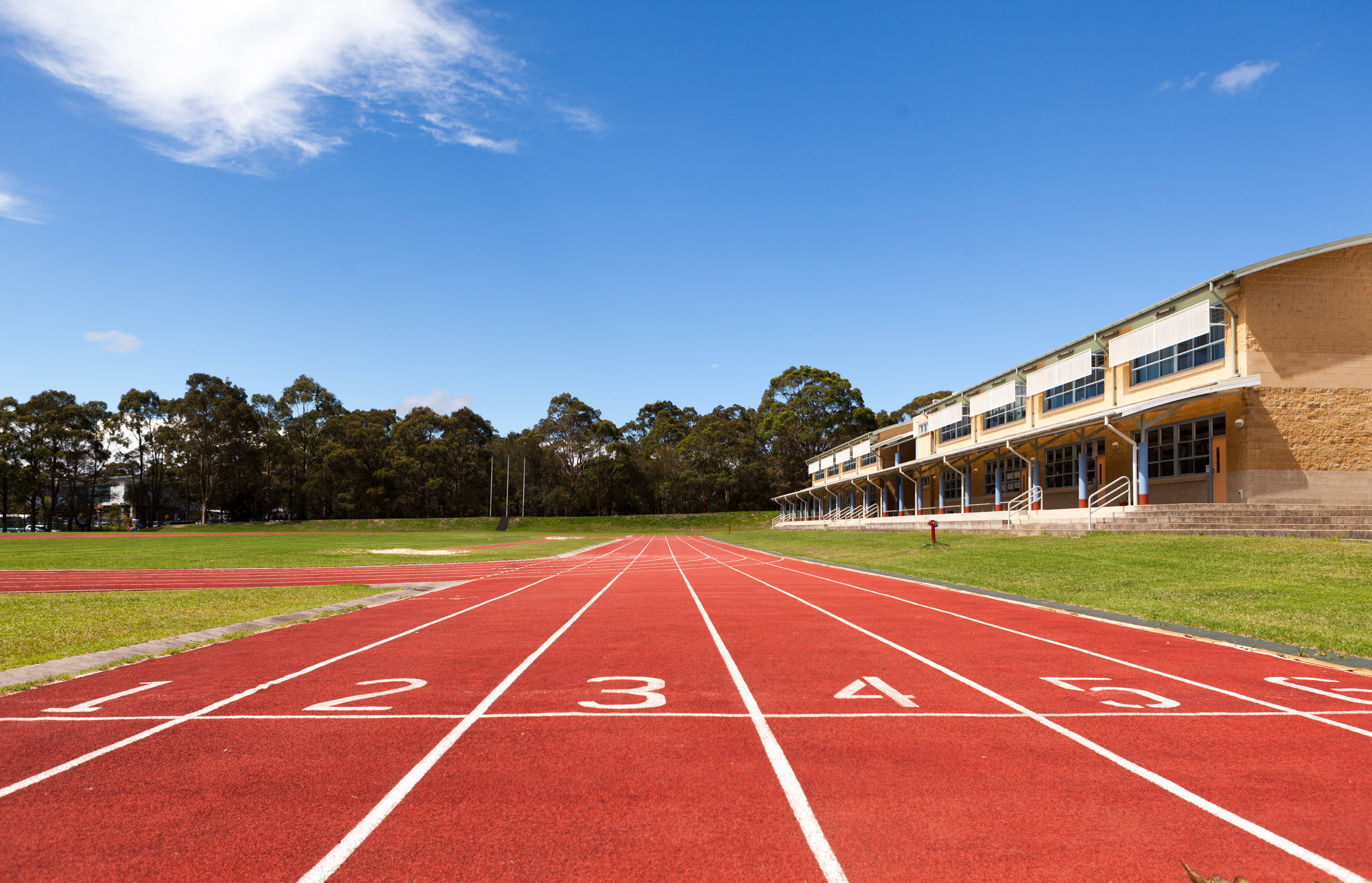
- The school in 2018

Location
- 112 Booralie Road, Terrey Hills, Northern Beaches, Sydney; Australia; 33°40′32″S 151°12′07″E

Information
- Former name: Sydney Japanese School
- Type: Independent co-educational Nihonjin gakkō (Japanese international) primary and secondary day school
- Established: May 1969; 57 years ago
- Oversight: New South Wales Department of Education; Ministry of Education, Culture, Sports, Science and Technology
- Specialist: Bilingual education: Japanese–English
- Principal: Shinya Ikawa
- Years: K–9
- Enrolment: 216 (2024)
- Campus size: 6 hectares (14 acres)
- Campus type: Suburban
- Website: sjis.nsw.edu.au

The Sydney Japanese International School (abbreviated as SJIS, Japanese: シドニー日本人国際学校, romanized: Shidonī Nihonjin Kokusai Gakkō), formerly known in English as the Sydney Japanese School, and in Japanese as シドニー日本人学校 Shidonī Nihonjin Gakkō, is an independent co-educational Nihonjin gakkō (Japanese international) primary and secondary day school, located in Terrey Hills within the Northern Beaches Council area of Sydney, Australia.

The school serves elementary and junior high school levels, from Year K to Year 9. The school accepts non-Japanese students, offering them international classes. SJIS is the only Japanese international school in the world to have an English-language division.

The international classes follow the New South Wales curriculum, while there is also a Japanese division following the Japanese curriculum. Tetsuo Mizukami (水上 徹男 Mizukami Tetsuo), author of The Sojourner Community: Japanese Migration and Residency in Australia, wrote in 2007 that the international classes were "so popular" that Australian parents have requested that the SJIS introduce them at the high school level.

== History ==
SJIS, the first overseas Japanese school not in an undeveloped country, opened in May 1969 in one room in a Lindfield church. The school was established due to an increase in the Japanese population in the Sydney area, and it served elementary and junior high school levels using a Japanese curriculum. SJIS moved to its permanent location in 1971. It began having the Australian curriculum division for kindergarten through grade 6 in 1975. The school acquired an additional 5 acres (2.0 ha) of land in October 1984. It established a kindergarten in January 1997.

== Admissions ==
The Japanese division accepts Japanese passport holders who have long-term visas in Australia. Students with other citizenships may be accepted into Japanese division depending on the school's decision. The international division accepts students with any citizenship so long as they at least have the right to live in Australia long-term and if their parents reside with them. The deputy principal conducts a language examination.

== Curriculum and instruction ==
Each division of SJIS focuses on one stream of education. The international division delivers the New South Wales Curriculum from Kindergarten through to Grade 6. The Japanese Division delivers the Japanese Curriculum from Grade 1 to Year 9. Japanese division students, as of 2014, do five hours of English each week. International division students, as of 2014, do five hours of Japanese instruction each week.

The students in both divisions combine classrooms in three of their subjects: Music, Physical Education and Visual Arts.

Bilingual assemblies are held weekly and all students study and play on campus throughout the day. By mainstreaming the two divisions the students feel very much part of one school.

=== Bilingual Education ===
At SJIS significant advances in second language teaching and learning are made through an affiliation with the Centre for Language Teaching Research at Macquarie University (Sydney). Curriculum development is monitored by some of Australia's top researcher's in second language acquisition.

All SJIS students from Kindergarten to year 6 have 45-minute language lessons; high school language lessons, 50 minutes per class, are for either Japanese or English. Overall, 150 hours of language instruction is given yearly. For both Japanese and English language lessons students are divided into two skill groups in year 1, then into three groups in years 2-6 based on skill level: beginner, intermediate, and advanced.

As of 2005 the school usually placed two or three non-Japanese students in each class.

== Campus ==
The school is on a 5.7-hectare (14-acre) campus located 25 kilometres (16 mi) north of the Sydney central business district. A two-storey classroom and office building was built in February 1996. The campus also contains a soccer oval and a 200-metre (660 ft) running track that was installed in 1993.

Classrooms include smartboards and telephones connected to the school's Information and Communication Technology (ICT) system. The campus has computer rooms, science laboratories, and special subject rooms such as those for music and home.

== Operations ==
Students are required to wear school uniforms. As of 2025, the annual tuition is A$13,680 per child.

== Student body ==
In 2023, the international division had 124 students while the Japanese division had 101 students. As of 2024, the total number of enrolments at SJIS was 216 students.

As of 2014 the international division had 87 students while the Japanese division had 79 students.

== See also ==
- Japanese Australian
- List of non-government schools in New South Wales

Part-time Japanese schools in Australia

- Canberra Japanese Supplementary School
- Melbourne International School of Japanese
- Japanese Language Supplementary School of Queensland
