= Supplementary Japanese Schools in Australia =

A Japanese supplementary school provides supplementary Japanese education to Japanese residents living abroad. There are three major Japanese supplementary schools in Australia, all designated by the Japanese Ministry of Education, Culture, Sports, Science and Technology (MEXT) as Hoshū jugyō kō, providing Japanese education to Japanese Australians and Japanese nationals on weekends.

== Canberra Japanese Supplementary School ==
Canberra Japanese Supplementary School Inc. (CJSS; キャンベラ補習授業校 Kyanbera Hoshū Jugyō Kō), established on 1 August 1988, is a Japanese supplementary school serving Japanese residents of Canberra, Australia. It holds its classes at Alfred Deakin High School in Deakin, while it has its school office in Yarralumla.

As of 2001, half of the approximately 60 students were dual nationals of Japan and Australia.

== Melbourne International School of Japanese ==
The Melbourne International School of Japanese, Inc. (MISJ; メルボルン国際日本語学校 Meruborun Kokusai Nihongo Gakkō) is a weekend Japanese supplementary school in Melbourne, Australia. It serves levels kindergarten through senior high school. Classes are held on Saturdays, at Oakleigh South Primary School in Oakleigh South.

=== History ===
The Japanese School of Melbourne, a full-time Japanese school, was formed out of the previous supplementary school, so a new supplementary program opened to replace it. There had been Japanese families who already had children enrolled in Australian schools at the time the JSM was established, with many of them being permanent residents. Therefore, there was demand for a new supplementary school.

The MISJ first opened in 1986. Because the school had formed to replace the JSM, the Japanese government had little connection with the new supplementary school. MISJ began admitting non-Japanese students in 1995; these students were divided into small classes based on their Japanese proficiency.

Previously the school held its classes at the Brighton Grammar School in Brighton. The school later moved classes to the Kilvington Girls' Grammar School in Ormond, and then Oakleigh South Primary School in Oakleigh South.

=== Student body ===
In April 1995 the MISJ had a total of 232 students in the Japanese national classes, which included some part-Japanese students from mixed marriages, and 23 international class students. The Japanese national classes included 53 kindergarten students, 129 students in grades 1–6, 38 junior high school students, and 12 senior high school students. In 2005 the school had a total of 324 students in all divisions, including 315 students in Japanese national classes and 9 international class students. The Japanese national classes included 73 preschool students, 169 elementary school students, 3 junior high school students, and 30 senior high school students.

== Japanese Language Supplementary School of Queensland ==
The Japanese Language Supplementary School of Queensland (JLSSQ; クイーンズランド日本語補習授業校 Kuīnzurando Nihongo Hoshū Jugyō Kō) is a weekend Japanese supplementary school serving Japanese nationals and Japanese Australians in the state of Queensland, Australia.

The institution consists of two schools, both with teachers from Japan. The Japanese School of Brisbane (ブリスベン校 Burisuben Kō) has classes in St Aidan’s Anglican Girls’ School in Corinda and offices in Taringa. Japanese School of Gold Coast (ゴールドコースト校 Gōrudo Kōsuto Kō) has classes in the All Saints Anglican School in Merrimac and offices in Surfers Paradise.

== See also ==
Full-time Japanese schools in Australia:

- Sydney Japanese International School
- The Japanese School of Melbourne
- The Japanese School in Perth
- South Queensland Academy (closed)
