= Nichigo Press =

Sachin

The Nichigo Press (Japanese: 日豪プレス) is an Australian Japanese-language newspaper. Established in 1977, it is Australia's longest-running Japanese-language newspaper.

== Etymology ==
The word nichigo is a romanisation of the Japanese, 日豪（にちごう or nichi'gō）, which literally means "Japan-Australia".

== Distribution ==
Three editions are published monthly. Nichigo Press National Edition is distributed nationally, but mostly contains information specific to Sydney. Nichigo Press Queensland Edition and Nichigo Press Victoria Edition are distributed later in the month, are less comprehensive, and contain material specific to the north-eastern and south-eastern regions of Australia respectively.

Nichigo Press is a free publication, and is financed by advertising.

Copies of all three editions are distributed through the Japanese Embassy in Australia, the Australian states' Consulates General of Japan, and various Japan-related businesses.
