= Arthur Aldrich =

- Born: 14 November 1840; Orford, Suffolk, England
- Died: 28 October 1908 (aged 67); Wellington, New Zealand
- Occupations: Railway executive and diplomat
- Known for: Secretary to Japanese Government Railways; Japanese Consul in New Zealand

Arthur Stanhope Aldrich (14 November 1840 – 28 October 1908) was an Englishman who became Chief Accountant and later, Secretary to the Japanese Government Railways, acting for over 20 years as General Adviser and Manager to the Railway Department. For his work he was awarded the Order of the Rising Sun. He later became an honorary consul to Japan in New Zealand.

== Biography ==
Arthur Stanhope Aldrich was born on 14 November 1840 at Orford, Suffolk, the son of Reverend William Wogan Aldrich and Dorothy (née Rope). Aldrich entered the Railway Clearing House, London in 1859, then entered the service of the Dublin and Drogheda Railway as audit accountant until January 1872. He was then recruited to work in Japan under the o-yatoi gaikokujin system as the Meiji Government strove to modernise the country. From 1870 almost 300 foreigners, mostly British, were hired to develop the Japanese railway system. Aldrich was appointed Chief Accountant to the Japan Government Railways in 1872, became Secretary in 1875, and from February 1877 was Secretary and general manager and advisor of the Railway Department of Public Works of Japan. Aldrich was the first Englishman presented with the Japanese Government's Order of the Rising Sun. He also received the Order of the Sacred Treasure (Second Class).

Aldrich retired with a pension in the 1890s and settled in Bunnythorpe, New Zealand. He was appointed as New Zealand's first Japanese Consul in April 1898, a post he held until his death when Thomas Young was appointed to replace him. Aldrich died at Paraparaumu on 28 October 1908, and was buried at Otaki.
