= TAFE Victoria =

Skills Victoria is the Victorian Government body that oversees Victoria's independent TAFE Institutes.

== Institutes ==
- Bendigo Kangan Institute
  - Bendigo TAFE
  - Kangan Institute
- Box Hill Institute
- Central Gippsland Institute
  - Advance TAFE - (East Gippsland Institute)
  - GippsTAFE
- Chisholm Institute
- Gordon Institute
- Goulburn Ovens Institute
- Holmes Institute
- Holmesglen Institute
- Melbourne Polytechnic
  - Prahran campus
- South West Institute
- Sunraysia Institute
- Technical Education Centre
- William Angliss Institute
- Wodonga Institute
  - Wodonga TAFE Radio

== Universities ==
- Federation University Australia
- RMIT University (Royal Melbourne Institute of Technology)
- Swinburne University of Technology
- Victoria University, Australia

== See also ==
- Technical and Further Education
