= Education in Sydney =

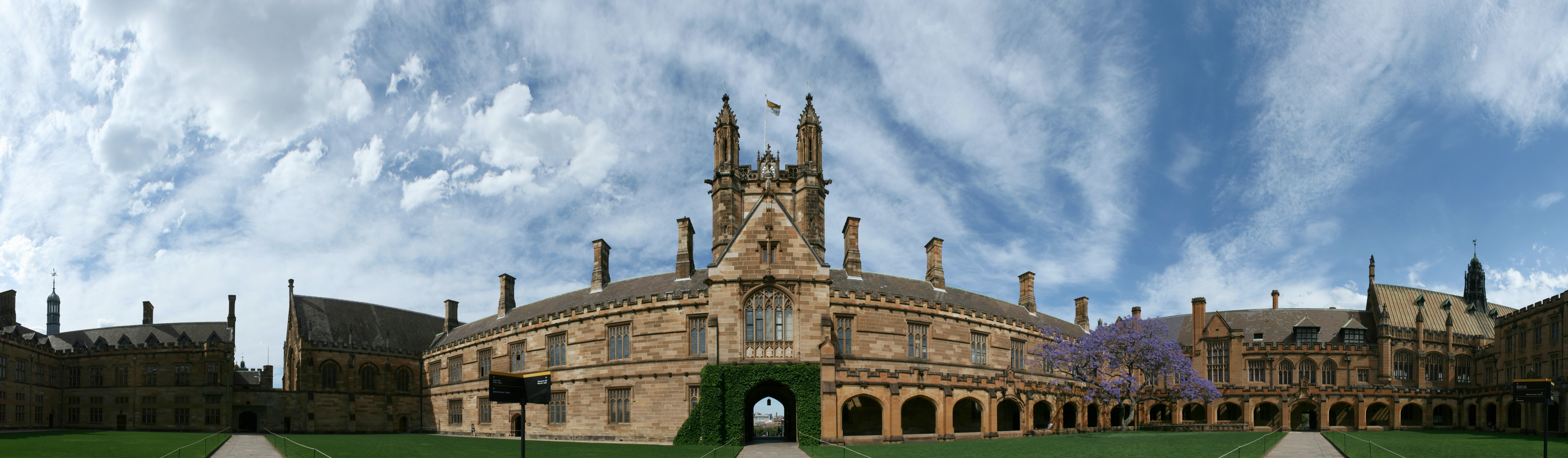
Panoramic view of The University of Sydney quadrangle

Sydney is home to some of Australia's most prestigious universities, technical institutions and schools. Entry to tertiary education for most students is via the New South Wales secondary school system where students are ranked by the Australian Tertiary Admission Rank (ATAR).

== Universities ==
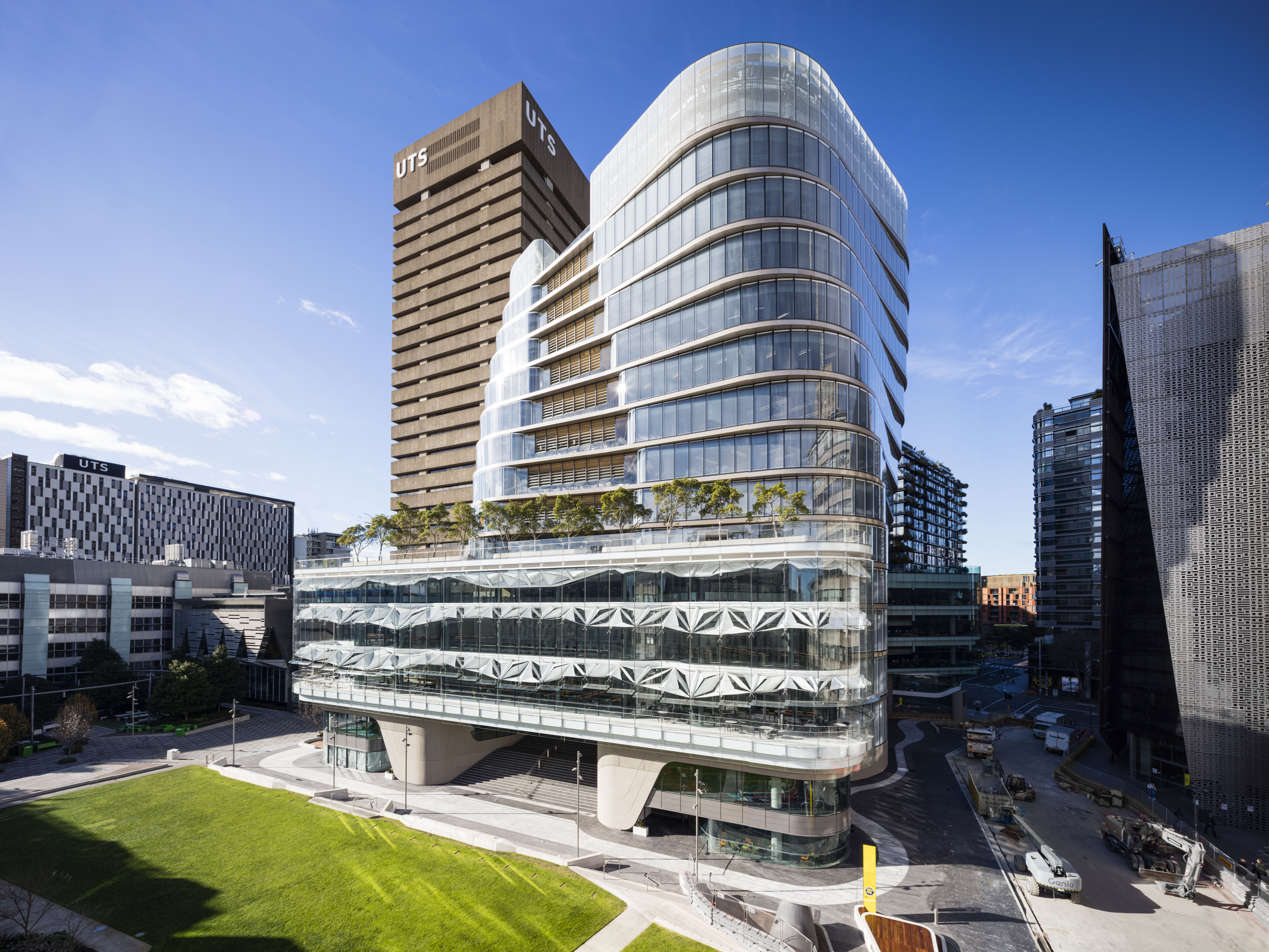
University of Technology, Sydney

Institution	Founded	Campus(es)
University of Sydney	1850	Main
University of Technology, Sydney	1988	Main
University of New South Wales	1949	Main
Macquarie University	1964	Main
Western Sydney University	1989	Main
Australian Catholic University	1991	Main
University of Notre Dame Australia	1989 (campus in 2006)	Secondary
University of Newcastle	1965	Secondary
University of Wollongong	1951	Secondary

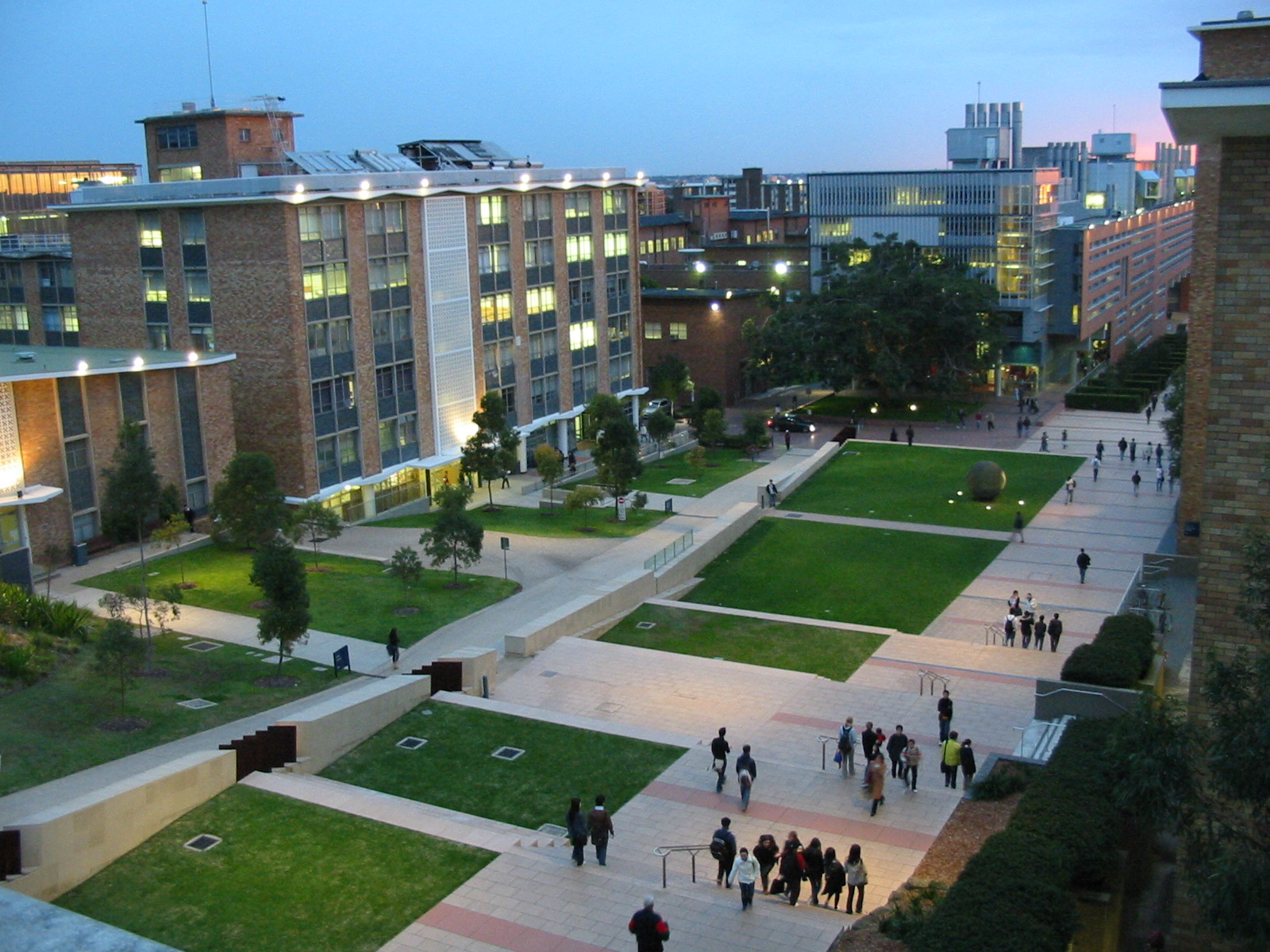
The University of New South Wales

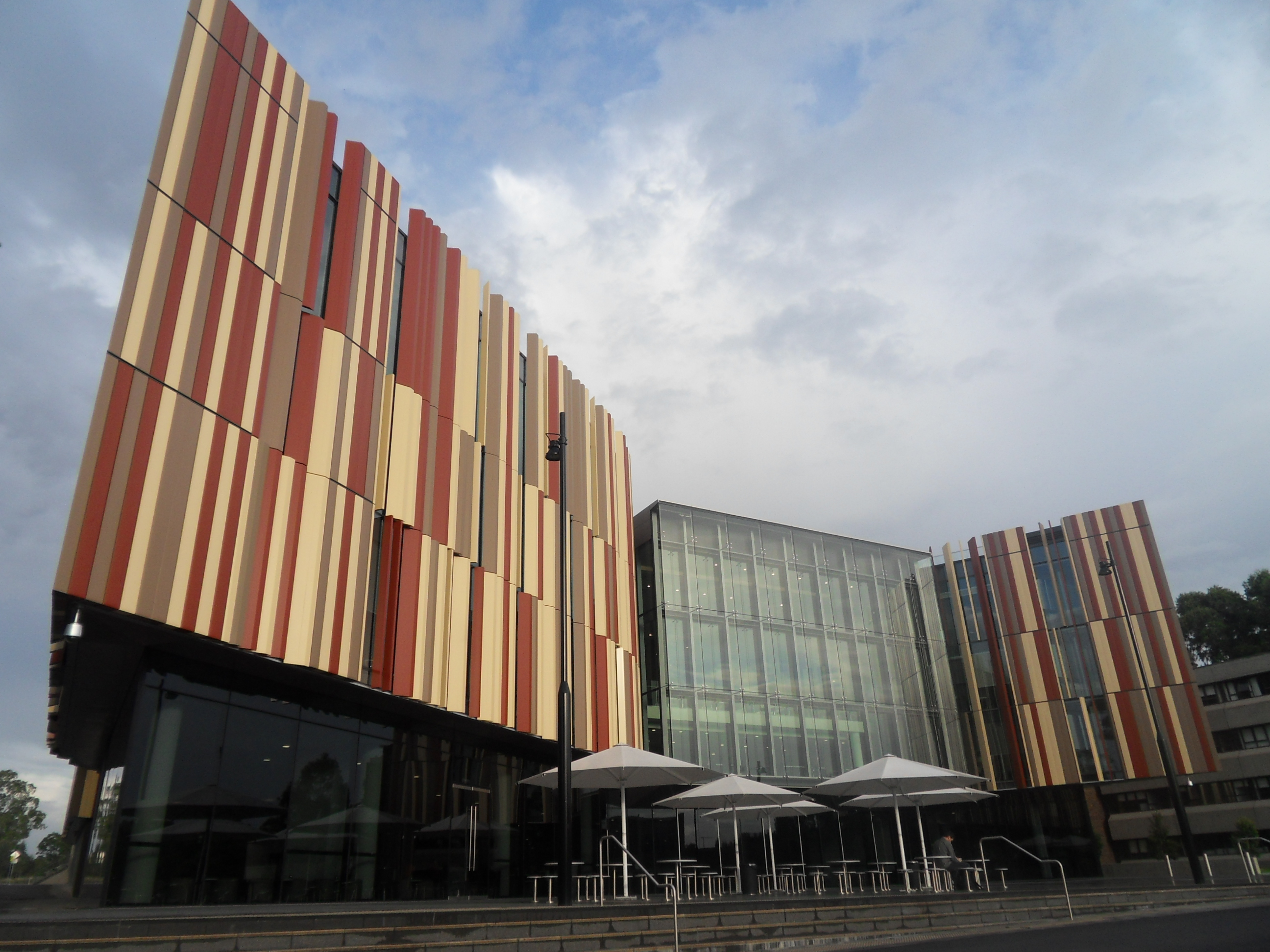
Macquarie University

Sydney is home to some of Australia's most prominent Universities, and is also the site of Australia's first university, the University of Sydney, established in 1850. There are five other public universities operating primarily in Sydney; Macquarie University, the University of New South Wales, the University of Technology, Sydney, Western Sydney University, and the Australian Catholic University (two out of six campuses). Other universities which operate secondary campuses in Sydney include the University of Notre Dame Australia, University of Wollongong and University of Newcastle.

== TAFE ==
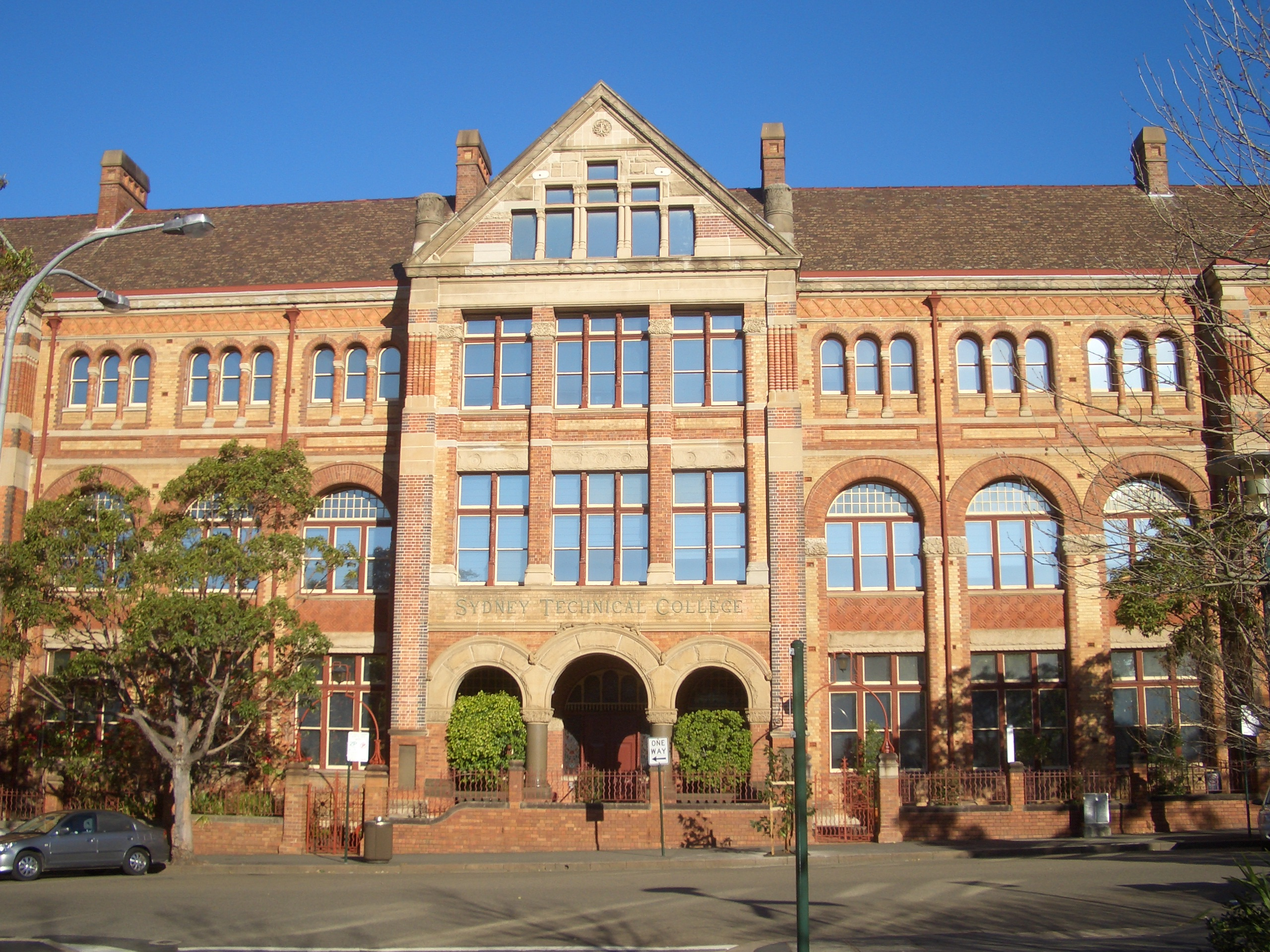
Sydney Institute of Technology

There are 2 multi-campus government-funded Technical and Further Education (TAFE) institutes in Sydney which provide vocational training at a tertiary level; namely, the Sydney Institute of Technology, North Sydney Institute of TAFE, Western Sydney Institute of TAFE (including OTEN) and South Western Sydney Institute of TAFE.

== Schools ==
State schools, including pre-schools, primary and secondary schools, and special schools are administered by the New South Wales Department of Education and Training. There are four state administered education areas in the Sydney metropolitan area that together coordinate 932 schools. There are also a large amount of private schools located in the Sydney region, most of which are either Catholic or Grammar Schools. Selective schools are high schools that admit students on the basis of certain criteria, usually academic testing through the selective schools test which is hosted each year usually in March to Year 6 students.

International schools in Sydney include the Lycée Condorcet, the French school; and the Sydney Japanese International School, the Japanese school.

== Miscellaneous education ==
The Sydney Saturday School of Japanese (SSSJ; シドニー日本語土曜学校 Shidonī Nihongo Doyō Gakkō), a weekend Japanese educational program, holds classes for Japanese national and Japanese Australian students at the Cammeray Public School in Cammeray.
