= West Coast Institute of Training =

West Coast Institute
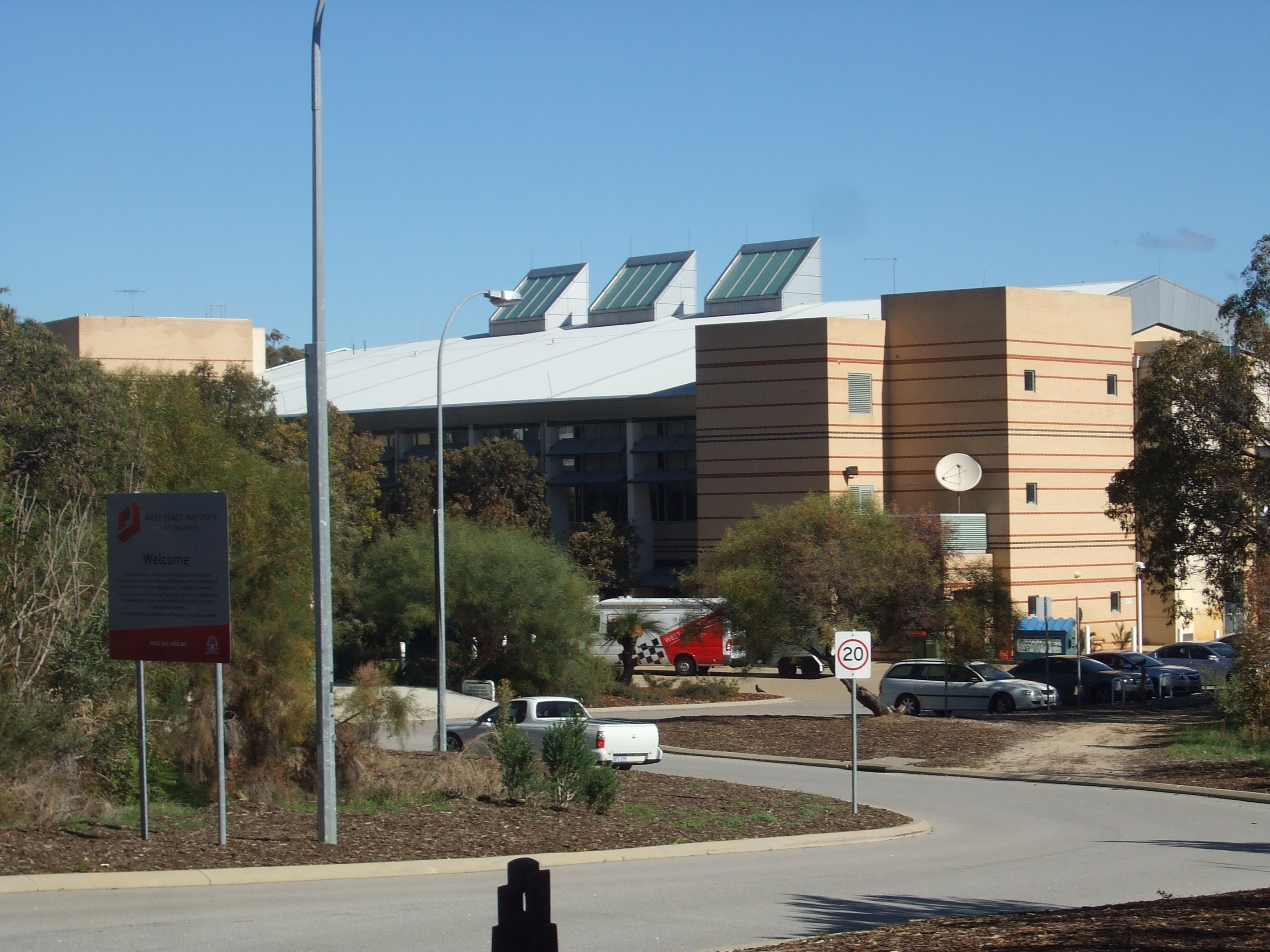
- Former names: 1977 – North Metropolitan College of TAFE; 1998 – West Coast College of TAFE
- Type: Technical and further education
- Established: 1998
- Officer in charge: Michelle Hoad (Managing Director)
- Location: Perth, Western Australia, Australia
- Website: wcit.wa.edu.au

West Coast Institute (formerly West Coast TAFE) was the TAFE institute servicing the northern suburbs of Perth, Western Australia. The institute, based in the Joondalup learning precinct 26 kilometres (16 mi) north of the Perth central business district, became part of North Metropolitan TAFE on 11 April 2016.

== History ==
The North Metropolitan College of TAFE began as two campuses in the Perth suburbs of Carine and Balga. Land for Carine Technical School was reserved on 19 March 1976 and an Order in Council giving authority to construct the college was gazetted on 22 April 1977.

With the reconfiguration of technical and further education in Australia in the mid-1980s, the North Metropolitan College of TAFE came into being. Construction of the Joondalup campus commenced in 1989, and the administration centre and the first blocks of classrooms were completed in 1992. On 6 April 1998, it was renamed West Coast College of TAFE. At the end of 2002, the Balga campus became part of Swan TAFE, primarily because its building and construction focus did not fit with West Coast TAFE's general profile, and the Carine campus was closed, with its hospitality centre moving to Joondalup.

On 10 September 2009, the college was renamed West Coast Institute of Training. A new campus, specialized in tradesmen apprenticeships and training programs, opened at Clarkson in 2011.

On 11 April 2016, The Government of Western Australia had announced the reform of the TAFEs. West Coast Institute of Training was merged with the Central Institute, becomes the North Metropolitan TAFE.

== Academies ==
The Institute had five academies in areas of particular importance to workforce development of Western Australia, namely:

- Aboriginal Academy of Sports, Health & Education
- Academy of Digital Technologies
- Academy of Health Sciences
- Academy of Hospitality & Culinary Arts
- Trades North

== Campuses ==
The West Coast Institute had four campuses:

- Kendrew Crescent, Joondalup
- McLarty Avenue, Joondalup
- Injune Way, Joondalup
- Clarkson
