= Great Southern Institute of Technology =

Technical and further education institution in Western Australia

- Former names: Albany Technical School
- Type: Technical and further education
- Established: 1974
- Location: Albany, W.A., Australia
- Campus: Albany, Denmark, Katanning and Mount Barker.
- Website: www.gsit.wa.edu.au/

Great Southern Institute of Technology (also known as GSIT), was a Technical and Further Education (TAFE) institution based in Albany, Western Australia.

GSIT was the largest training provider in the Great Southern region of Western Australia prior to its amalgamation with other training providers in the region to become South Regional TAFE. It operated at more than 10 sites, including four major campuses and provided 95% of the region's vocational education and training.

The primary campus was in the region's administrative center of Albany, located 418 km SE from the state capital Perth.

== History ==
GSIT was officially opened on 1 November 1974 as Albany Technical School.

== Industry Training Areas ==
- Art and Music
- Business, Management, and Finance
- Community, Children, and Education
- Environment and Rural
- Health and Aged Care
- IT, Media, and Design
- Literacy, Numeracy, and Languages
- Skills Development Center
- Tourism and Events Management
- Trades and Safety
- Training and Assessment

== Qualifications ==
Great Southern Institute of Technology award courses were in line with the Australian Quality Training Framework (AQTF). The AQTF establishes standard titles and levels for courses across Australia. The qualifications that are currently offered at GSIT include:

- Advanced Diploma
- Diploma
- Certificate IV
- Certificate III
- Certificate II
- Certificate I

== Campuses ==
- Albany
- Denmark
- Katanning
- Mount Barker
