= Victorian College of Agriculture and Horticulture =

Former group of agriculture schools in Victoria, Australia

The Victorian College of Agriculture and Horticulture, abbreviated VCAH, was a grouping of the agricultural colleges of the State of Victoria in Australia. Formed in 1983, it was later incorporated as a company limited by guarantee in 1991. It provided a coordinated framework for the five colleges of Burnley (1891), Dookie (1886), Gilbert Chandler (1939), Glenormiston (1971) and Longerenong (1889), and the McMillan Rural Studies Centre (1977) to form a single institution. Separation from the Victorian Department of Agriculture had been a dream for decades and in becoming a reality created an innovative and flexible institution which enlivened Victorian agricultural education, creating real competition with the two university providers (University of Melbourne and La Trobe University).

In 1997, the college merged with similar departments at the University of Melbourne to form that university's Institute of Land and Food Resources (later Faculty of Land and Food Resources). This 'merger' was more of a takeover, and only the Burnley and Dookie campus remain with the university in 2020, with the other campuses being moved to the TAFE sector fairly rapidly after the merger. The remaining campuses bear little resemblance to those of the 1990s in terms of their course offerings. Dookie was a virtual ghost town up until recent changes for student residency in the BAg. The merger period was a brutal period for former VCAH staff, with many long-serving staff having their employment terminated because they did not fit the university teaching-research ideal. Many staff felt as if they had been sold-out by VCAH management.

In a hostile funding period, VCAH proved an essential component to the preservation of practically oriented education for the primary industries sector. A thorn in the side of other institutions, it provided the reminder of the need for relevance and the strength of industry as a partner. Such resilience should not have surprised the universities or the Department of Agriculture, for it was an institution conceived in conflict and born strong after a difficult birth.

== See also ==
- Gardening in Australia
