= List of acts of the Parliament of Victoria from 2009 =

This is a list of acts of the Parliament of Victoria, Australia for the year 2009.

== 2009 ==
Short title, or popular name	Citation	Royal assent
Long title
Crimes Legislation Amendment (Food and Drink Spiking) Act 2009	No. 1 of 2009	10 February 2009
An Act to amend the Summary Offences Act 1966 (Note: Summary Offences Act 1966 (No. 7405)) to create a new offence dealing with the spiking of another person's food or drink and to extend an existing offence in the Crimes Act 1958 (Note: Crimes Act 1958 (No. 6231)) and for other purposes.
Fundraising Appeals and Consumer Acts Amendment Act 2009	No. 2 of 2009	
Major Crime Legislation Amendment Act 2009	No. 3 of 2009	
Relationships Amendment (Caring Relationships) Act 2009	No. 4 of 2009	
Serious Sex Offenders Monitoring Amendment Act 2009	No. 5 of 2009	
Resources Industry Legislation Amendment Act 2009	No. 6 of 2009	
Criminal Procedure Act 2009	No. 7 of 2009	10 March 2009
An Act to provide for procedures for the initiation and conduct of criminal proceedings and appeals in criminal proceedings, to amend the Crimes Act 1958, the Crimes (Mental Impairment and Unfitness to be Tried) Act 1997, (Note: Crimes (Mental Impairment and Unfitness to be Tried) Act 1997 (No. 65 of 1997)) the Magistrates' Court Act 1989, (Note: Magistrates' Court Act 1989 (No. 51 of 1989)) the Children, Youth and Families Act 2005, (Note: Children, Youth and Families Act 2005 (No. 96 of 2005)) the Sentencing Act 1991 (Note: Sentencing Act 1991 (No. 49 of 1991)) and the Appeal Costs Act 1998 (Note: Appeal Costs Act 1998 (No. 87 of 1998)) and to repeal the Crimes (Criminal Trials) Act 1999 (Note: Crimes (Criminal Trials) Act 1999 (No. 35 of 1999)) and for other purposes.
Liquor Control Reform Amendment (Enforcement) Act 2009	No. 8 of 2009	
Sheriff Act 2009	No. 9 of 2009	24 March 2009
An Act to provide a legislative framework for the appointment of the sheriff, the deputy sheriff and sheriff's officers and their functions, powers and duties and to amend the Supreme Court Act 1986, (Note: Supreme Court Act 1986 (No. 110 of 1986)) the County Court Act 1958, (Note: County Court Act 1958 (No. 6230)) the Magistrates' Court Act 1989 and the Interpretation of Legislation Act 1984 (Note: Interpretation of Legislation Act 1984 (No. 10096)) and for other purposes.
Victoria Law Foundation Act 2009	No. 10 of 2009	24 March 2009
An Act to provide for the continuation of the Victoria Law Foundation and to repeal the Victoria Law Foundation Act 1978 (Note: Victoria Law Foundation Act 1978 (No. 9174)) and for other purposes.
Melbourne University Amendment Act 2009	No. 11 of 2009	6 April 2009
An Act to amend the Melbourne University Act 1958 (Note: University Act 1958 (No. 6405)) to facilitate the amalgamation between the Faculty of the Victorian College of the Arts and the Faculty of Music at The University of Melbourne and for other purposes.
Associations Incorporation Amendment Act 2009	No. 12 of 2009	
Bus Safety Act 2009	No. 13 of 2009	7 April 2009
An Act to provide for the safe operation of bus services in Victoria, to amend the Public Transport Competition Act 1995, (Note: Public Transport Competition Act 1995 (No. 68 of 1995)) the Rail Safety Act 2006, (Note: Rail Safety Act 2006 (No. 9 of 2006)) the Road Safety Act 1986 (Note: Road Safety Act 1986 (No. 127 of 1986)) and the Transport Act 1983, (Note: Transport Act 1983 (No. 9921)) to make consequential amendments to certain other Acts and for other purposes.
Equal Opportunity Amendment (Governance) Act 2009	No. 14 of 2009	
Melbourne Cricket Ground Act 2009	No. 15 of 2009	
Human Services (Complex Needs) Act 2009	No. 16 of 2009	
Transport Legislation Miscellaneous Amendments Act 2009	No. 17 of 2009	
Bushfires Royal Commission (Report) Act 2009	No. 18 of 2009	
Fair Trading and Other Acts Amendment Act 2009	No. 19 of 2009	
Parliamentary Salaries and Superannuation Amendment Act 2009	No. 20 of 2009	
Workplace Rights Advocate (Repeal) Act 2009	No. 21 of 2009	
Crimes Amendment (Identity Crime) Act 2009	No. 22 of 2009	
Energy Legislation Amendment (Australian Energy Market Operator) Act 2009	No. 23 of 2009	
Fair Work (Commonwealth Powers) Act 2009	No. 24 of 2009	17 June 2009
An Act to refer certain matters to the Commonwealth regarding workplace relations, to repeal the Commonwealth Powers (Industrial Relations) Act 1996 (Note: Commonwealth Powers (Industrial Relations) Act 1996 (No. 59 of 1996)) and the Victorian Workers' Wages Protection Act 2007, (Note: Victorian Workers' Wages Protection Act 2007 (No. 71 of 2007)) to amend the Long Service Leave Act 1992, (Note: Employee Relations Act 1992 (No. 83 of 1992)) the Public Sector Employment (Award Entitlements) Act 2006, (Note: Public Sector Employment (Award Entitlements) Act 2006 (No. 15 of 2006)) the Outworkers (Improved Protection) Act 2003, (Note: Outworkers (Improved Protection) Act 2003 (No. 22 of 2003)) the Public Holidays Act 1993, (Note: Public Holidays Act 1993 (No. 119 of 1993)) the Occupational Health and Safety Act 2004, (Note: Occupational Health and Safety Act 2004 (No. 107 of 2004)) the Public Administration Act 2004 (Note: Public Administration Act 2004 (No. 108 of 2004)) and the Parliamentary Administration Act 2005 (Note: Parliamentary Administration Act 2005 (No. 20 of 2005)) and for other purposes.
Justice Legislation Amendment Act 2009	No. 25 of 2009	
Transport Legislation General Amendments Act 2009	No. 26 of 2009	
Public Administration Amendment Act 2009	No. 27 of 2009	
Road Legislation Amendment Act 2009	No. 28 of 2009	
Gambling Regulation Amendment (Licensing) Act 2009	No. 29 of 2009	
Major Sporting Events Act 2009 or the Major Events Act 2009	No. 30 of 2009	23 June 2009
An Act to re-enact with amendments and to consolidate into one Act the law relating to major sporting events and to venues for events, to repeal the Major Events (Aerial Advertising) Act 2007, (Note: Major Events (Aerial Advertising) Act 2007 (No. 13 of 2007)) the Major Events (Crowd Management) Act 2003 (Note: Major Events (Crowd Management) Act 2003 (No. 19 of 2003)) and the Sports Event Ticketing (Fair Access) Act 2002, (Note: Sports Event Ticketing (Fair Access) Act 2002 (No. 47 of 2002)) to consequentially amend other Acts and for other purposes.
Appropriation (2009/2010) Act 2009 (repealed)	No. 31 of 2009	
(Repealed by Statute Law Revision Act 2013 (No. 70 of 2013)
Appropriation (Parliament 2009/2010) Act 2009 (repealed)	No. 32 of 2009	
(Repealed by Statute Law Revision Act 2013 (No. 70 of 2013)
Classification (Publications, Films and Computer Games) (Enforcement) Amendment Act 2009	No. 33 of 2009	
Occupational Health and Safety Amendment (Employee Protection) Act 2009	No. 34 of 2009	
Primary Industries Legislation Amendment Act 2009	No. 35 of 2009	
Primary Industries Legislation Further Amendment Act 2009	No. 36 of 2009	
State Taxation Acts Amendment Act 2009	No. 37 of 2009	
Superannuation Legislation Amendment Act 2009	No. 38 of 2009	
Duties Amendment Act 2009	No. 39 of 2009	
Crown Land Acts Amendment (Lease and Licence Terms) Act 2009	No. 40 of 2009	
Electricity Industry Amendment (Premium Solar Feed-in Tariff) Act 2009	No. 41 of 2009	
Food Amendment (Regulation Reform) Act 2009	No. 42 of 2009	
Gambling Regulation Amendment Act 2009	No. 43 of 2009	
Legislation Reform (Repeals No. 4) Act 2009	No. 44 of 2009	
Statute Law Amendment (Charter of Human Rights and Responsibilities) Act 2009	No. 45 of 2009	
Children Legislation Amendment Act 2009	No. 46 of 2009	
Human Tissue Amendment Act 2009	No. 47 of 2009	
National Parks Amendment (Point Nepean) Act 2009	No. 48 of 2009	
Tobacco Amendment (Protection of Children) Act 2009	No. 49 of 2009	
Courts Legislation Amendment (Judicial Resolution Conference) Act 2009	No. 50 of 2009	
Courts Legislation Amendment (Sunset Provisions) Act 2009	No. 51 of 2009	
Racing Legislation Amendment (Racing Integrity Assurance) Act 2009	No. 52 of 2009	
Local Government Amendment (Conflicting Duties) Act 2009	No. 53 of 2009	
Water Amendment (Non Water User Limit) Act 2009	No. 54 of 2009	
Justice Legislation Further Amendment Act 2009	No. 55 of 2009	
Major Transport Projects Facilitation Act 2009	No. 56 of 2009	
Energy and Resources Legislation Amendment Act 2009	No. 57 of 2009	
Gambling Regulation Further Amendment Act 2009	No. 58 of 2009	
Liquor Control Reform Amendment (Licensing) Act 2009	No. 59 of 2009	
Personal Property Securities (Commonwealth Powers) Act 2009	No. 60 of 2009	
Cemeteries and Crematoria Amendment Act 2009	No. 61 of 2009	
Education and Training Reform Amendment (School Age) Act 2009	No. 62 of 2009	
Gambling Regulation Amendment (Racing Club Venue Operator Licences) Act 2009	No. 63 of 2009	
Local Government Amendment (Offences and Other Matters) Act 2009	No. 64 of 2009	
Local Government (Brimbank City Council) Act 2009	No. 65 of 2009	
Planning Legislation Amendment Act 2009	No. 66 of 2009	
Victorian Renewable Energy Amendment Act 2009	No. 67 of 2009	
Criminal Procedure Amendment (Consequential and Transitional Provisions) Act 2009	No. 68 of 2009	
Statute Law Amendment (Evidence Consequential Provisions) Act 2009	No. 69 of 2009	
Constitution (Appointments) Act 2009	No. 70 of 2009	
Deakin University Act 2009	No. 71 of 2009	1 December 2009
An Act to re-enact with amendments the law relating to Deakin University, to repeal the Deakin University Act 1974, (Note: Deakin University Act 1974 (No. 8610)) the Deakin University (Warrnambool) Act 1990 (Note: Deakin University (Warrnambool) Act 1990 (No. 28 of 1990)) and the Deakin University (Victoria College) Act 1991 (Note: Deakin University (Victoria College) Act 1991 (No. 41 of 1991)) and for other purposes.
Electricity Industry Amendment (Critical Infrastructure) Act 2009	No. 72 of 2009	1 December 2009
Emergency Services Legislation Amendment Act 2009	No. 73 of 2009	1 December 2009
Fair Work (Commonwealth Powers) Amendment Act 2009	No. 74 of 2009	1 December 2009
La Trobe University Act 2009	No. 75 of 2009	1 December 2009
An Act to re-enact with amendments the law relating to La Trobe University, to repeal the La Trobe University Act 1964 (Note: La Trobe University Act 1964 (No. 7189)) and other Acts and for other purposes.
Monash University Act 2009	No. 76 of 2009	1 December 2009
An Act to re-enact with amendments the law relating to Monash University, to repeal the Monash University Act 1958, (Note: Monash University Act 1958 (No. 6184)) the Monash University (Chisholm and Gippsland) Act 1990, (Note: Monash University (Chisholm and Gippsland) Act 1990 (No. 22 of 1990)) the Monash University (Pharmacy College) Act 1992, (Note: Monash University (Pharmacy College) Act 1992 (No. 10 of 1992)) to make a consequential amendment to the Leo Cussen Institute Act 1972 (Note: Leo Cussen Institute for Continuing Legal Education Act 1972 (No. 8254)) and for other purposes.
Sentencing Amendment Act 2009	No. 77 of 2009	1 December 2009
University of Melbourne Act 2009	No. 78 of 2009	1 December 2009
An Act to re-enact with amendments the law relating to The University of Melbourne, to repeal the Melbourne University Act 1958 (Note: University Act 1958 (No. 6405)) and other Acts, to make consequential amendments to other Acts and for other purposes.
Health Practitioner Regulation National Law (Victoria) Act 2009	No. 79 of 2009	
Land Legislation Amendment Act 2009	No. 80 of 2009	
Land (Revocation of Reservations and Other Matters) Act 2009	No. 81 of 2009	
Parks and Crown Land Legislation Amendment (River Red Gums) Act 2009	No. 82 of 2009	
State Taxation Acts Further Amendment Act 2009	No. 83 of 2009	
Casino Legislation Amendment Act 2009	No. 84 of 2009	
Education and Training Reform Amendment (Overseas Students) Act 2009	No. 85 of 2009	
Fire Services Funding (Feasibility Study) Act 2009 (repealed)	No. 86 of 2009	
(Repealed by Statute Law Repeals Act 2012 (No. 30 of 2012))
Justice Legislation Miscellaneous Amendments Act 2009	No. 87 of 2009	
Liquor Control Reform Amendment (Party Buses) Act 2009	No. 88 of 2009	
Melbourne Cricket Ground and Yarra Park Amendment Act 2009	No. 89 of 2009	
Parks and Crown Land Legislation Amendment (East Gippsland) Act 2009	No. 90 of 2009	
Serious Sex Offenders (Detention and Supervision) Act 2009	No. 91 of 2009	15 December 2009
An Act to enhance the protection of the community by requiring offenders who have served custodial sentences for certain sexual offences and who present an unacceptable risk of harm to the community to be subject to ongoing detention or supervision, to amend the Corrections Act 1986 (Note: Corrections Act 1986 (No. 117 of 1986)) and other Acts and to repeal the Serious Sex Offenders Monitoring Act 2005 (Note: Serious Sex Offenders Monitoring Act 2005 (No. 1 of 2005)) and for other purposes.
Summary Offences and Control of Weapons Acts Amendment Act 2009	No. 92 of 2009	
Transport Legislation Amendment (Hoon Boating and Other Amendments) Act 2009	No. 93 of 2009	
Valuation of Land Amendment Act 2009	No. 94 of 2009	15 December 2009
An Act to amend the Valuation of Land Act 1960, (Note: Valuation of Land Act 1960 (No. 6653)) to make consequential amendments to other Acts and for other purposes.

== Sources ==
- "Acts as made: 2009". Victoria Legislation.
