= Gilbert Chandler College =

Former agricultural school in Werribee, Australia

The Gilbert Chandler College was a higher education institution in Werribee, Victoria, Australia. It was a standalone institution from 1939 to 1981, a college of the Victorian College of Agriculture and Horticulture from 1983 to 1997, and a campus of the University of Melbourne from 1997 to 2005. The site was later used as a campus of the Goulburn Ovens Institute of TAFE until 2020.

It was established in 1939 as the Department of Agriculture-run School of Dairy Technology. Student accommodation was built at the campus in 1964-65.

It was renamed the Gilbert Chandler Institute of Dairy Technology (after state Minister for Agriculture Gilbert Chandler) in 1967 as part of a significant expansion of facilities in 1965-68, which included a modern dairy factory with facilities for "milk and cream receival, milk pasteurising and bottling, cheesemaking, buttermaking, milk concentrating and drying, with casein and laboratory sections".

In 1981, the teaching section became the Gilbert Chandler College of Dairy Technology under the broader Gilbert Chandler Institute, and later the same year was proclaimed an agricultural college. It became part of the new Victorian College of Agriculture and Horticulture in 1983, along with the state's other agricultural colleges, becoming VCAH's Gilbert Chandler Campus. Course offerings expanded throughout the 1980s, with degree courses offered, additional facilities constructed, including a new library, and course offerings dramatically overhauled again in the early 1990s.

In 1997, VCAH amalgamated with the University of Melbourne, and it became the Gilbert Chandler Campus of the university as part of the Institute of Land and Food Resources. It It assumed a broader food manufacturing focus during its time as part of the University of Melbourne. At its closure, the campus offered undergraduate degrees, postgraduate certificates and diplomas and PhD and masters programs in food science.

The University of Melbourne ceased operating agricultural courses at the campus at the end of 2005. It terminated its lease and transferred the campus back to the state Government in 2007.

The campus was subsequently leased by the state government to the Goulburn Ovens Institute of TAFE (GOTAFE), becoming its Werribee campus and dropping the Gilbert Chandler name. GOTAFE again adopted a focus on dairy processing qualifications, providing certificate to advanced diploma courses in partnership with the National Centre for Dairy Education. The GOTAFE campus closed at the end of 2020.
