= List of acts of the Parliament of Victoria from 1990 =

This is a list of acts of the Parliament of Victoria, Australia for the year 1990.

== 1990 ==
Short title, or popular name	Citation	Royal assent
Long title
Tattersall Consultations (Amendment) Act 1990 (repealed)	No. 14 of 1990	22 May 1990
An Act to amend the Tattersall Consultations Act 1958 (Note: Tattersall Consultations Act 1958 (No. 6390)) and for other purposes. (Repealed by Statute Law Revision (Repeals) Act 1999 (No. 3 of 1999))
Australian Airlines (Intrastate Services) Act 1990	No. 15 of 1990	22 May 1990
An Act to enable Australian Airlines Limited to operate air services within Victoria, to repeal the Air Navigation Act 1958 (Note: Air Navigation Act 1958 (No. 6197)) and for other purposes.
Administrative Appeals Tribunal (Planning) Act 1990	No. 18 of 1990	29 May 1990
An Act to amend the Administrative Appeals Tribunal Act 1984 (Note: Administrative Appeals Tribunal Act 1984 (No. 10155)) and the Planning Appeals Act 1980 (Note: Planning Appeals Board Act 1980 (No. 9512)) and for other purposes.
Supply (1990-91, No. 1) Act 1990 (repealed)	No. 19 of 1990	29 May 1990
An Act to make interim provision for the appropriation of moneys out of the Consolidated Fund for recurrent services and for certain works and purposes for the financial year 1990-91. (Repealed by Statute Law Revision (Repeals) Act 1999 (No. 3 of 1999))
Works and Services (Ancillary Provisions, 1990-91, No. 1) Act 1990 (repealed)	No. 20 of 1990	29 May 1990
An Act to make ancillary provisions for certain works and purposes for the financial year 1990-91. (Repealed by Statute Law Revision (Repeals) Act 1999 (No. 3 of 1999))
Victoria University of Technology Act 1990	No. 21 of 1990	30 May 1990
An Act to establish a university to be known as Victoria University of Technology, to amend the Post-Secondary Education Act 1978, (Note: Post-Secondary Education Act 1978 (No. 9145)) the Teaching Service Act 1981, (Note: Education Service Act 1981 (No. 9714)) the Vocational Education and Training Act 1990 (Note: Vocational Education and Training Act 1990 (No. 45 of 1990)) and for other purposes.
Monash University (Chisholm and Gippsland) Act 1990	No. 22 of 1990	5 June 1990
An Act to provide for the merger of the Chisholm Institute of Technology and the Gippsland Institute of Advanced Education with Monash University, to amend the Monash University Act 1958 (Note: Monash University Act 1958 (No. 6184)) and for other purposes.
Melbourne College of Divinity (Amendment) Act 1990 (repealed)	No. 23 of 1990	5 June 1990
An Act to amend the Melbourne College of Divinity Act 1910 (Note: Melbourne College of Divinity Act 1910 (1 Geo. V. No. 2275)) and for other purposes. (Repealed by Statute Law Revision (Repeals) Act 1999 (No. 3 of 1999))
Control of Weapons Act 1990	No. 24 of 1990	5 June 1990
An Act to regulate weapons other than firearms, to repeal the Prescribed Weapons Act 1989, (Note: Prescribed Weapons Act 1989 (No. 39 of 1989)) to amend the Crimes Act 1958, (Note: Crimes Act 1958 (No. 6231)) the Firearms Act 1958, (Note: Firearms Act 1958 (No. 6251)) the Summary Offences Act 1966 (Note: Summary Offences Act 1966 (No. 7405)) and the Vagrancy Act 1966 (Note: Vagrancy Act 1966 (No. 7393)) and for other purposes.
Quarantine Officers (Transfer) Act 1990	No. 27 of 1990	5 June 1990
An Act to provide for the transfer of certain Commonwealth officers to the Victorian Public Service and for other purposes.
Deakin University (Warrnambool) Act 1990	No. 28 of 1990	5 June 1990
An Act to provide for the merger of the Warrnambool Institute of Advanced Education with Deakin University, to amend the Deakin University Act 1974 (Note: Deakin University Act 1974 (No. 8610)) and for other purposes.
Rooming Houses Act 1990 (repealed)	No. 33 of 1990	13 June 1990
An Act to define the rights and duties of owners and residents of rooming houses and for other purposes. (Repealed by Residential Tenancies Act 1997 (No. 109 of 1997))
Vocational Education and Training Act 1990	No. 45 of 1990	19 June 1990
An Act to establish a State Training System in Victoria and to amend the Post-Secondary Education Act 1978, to amend the Employment and Training Act 1981 (Note: Employment and Training Act 1981 (No. 9678)) and to repeal the Industrial Training Act 1975 (Note: Industrial Training Act 1975 (No. 8706)) and for other purposes.
Classification of Films and Publications Act 1990	No. 46 of 1990	19 June 1990
An Act to provide for classification of films and publications, to repeal certain Acts and for other purposes.
Land (IOOF) Act 1990 (Note: IOOF refers to the Independent Order of Odd Fellows.)	No. 47 of 1990	11 September 1990
An Act to revoke the permanent reservation and Crown grant of certain land at Melbourne, to repeal the Oddfellows Hall (Melbourne) Land Act 1930 (Note: Oddfellows Hall (Melbourne) Land Act 1930 (No. 3887)) and for other purposes.
Agricultural Industry Development Act 1990	No. 48 of 1990	18 September 1990
An Act relating to the marketing of certain agricultural commodities; to provide for the establishment and functions of committees in respect of certain of those products; to provide for the establishment and functions of a Wine Grape Industry Negotiating Committee; to repeal the Wine Grape Processing Industry Act 1978; (Note: Wine Grape Processing Industry Act 1978 (No. 9213)) and for other purposes.
Appropriation (1990-91, No. 1) Act 1990 (repealed)	No. 50 of 1990	23 October 1990
(Repealed by Statute Law Revision (Repeals) Act 1999 (No. 3 of 1999))
Works and Services (Ancillary Provisions, 1990-91, No. 2) Act 1990 (repealed)	No. 51 of 1990	23 October 1990
An Act to make further ancillary provisions for certain works and purposes for the financial year 1990-91. (Repealed by Statute Law Revision (Repeals) Act 1999 (No. 3 of 1999))
Judicial Studies Board Act 1990	No. 60 of 1990	20 November 1990
An Act to establish a Judicial Studies Board and for other purposes.
Victorian Public Offices Corporation (Repeal) Act 1990 (repealed)	No. 65 of 1990	20 November 1990
An Act to repeal the Victorian Public Offices Corporation Act 1974, (Note: Victorian Public Offices Corporation Act 1974 (No. 8626)) to amend various other Acts and for other purposes. (Repealed by Statute Law Revision (Repeals) Act 1999 (No. 3 of 1999))
Westernport (Oil Refinery) Land Act 1990	No. 71 of 1990	4 December 1990
An Act to remove certain easements, rights and covenants over Crown land at Crib Point and for other purposes.
Collingwood (Victoria Park) Land Act 1990	No. 73 of 1990	4 December 1990
An Act to free land at Collingwood from a covenant and any trust affecting it and for other purposes.
Debits Tax Act 1990	No. 78 of 1990	11 December 1990
An Act for the imposition and collection of a tax in respect of certain debits made to accounts kept with financial institutions and for other purposes.
Public Authorities (Equal Employment Opportunity) Act 1990 (repealed)	No. 79 of 1990	11 December 1990
An Act to provide for equal employment opportunity programs in public authorities and for other purposes. (Repealed by Public Sector Reform (Miscellaneous Amendments) Act 1998 (No. 46 of 1998))
Corporations (Victoria) Act 1990	No. 80 of 1990	11 December 1990
An Act to apply certain provisions of laws of the Commonwealth relating to corporations, the securities industry and the futures industry as laws of Victoria and for other purposes
Building Societies (Prudential Standards) Act 1990 (repealed)	No. 90 of 1990	11 December 1990
An Act to amend the Building Societies Act 1986 (Note: Building Societies Act 1986 (No. 8 of 1986)) to strengthen controls over building societies, to amend the Co-operation Act 1981 (Note: Co-operation Act 1981 (No. 8718)) and the Friendly Societies Act 1986 (Note: Friendly Societies Act 1986 (No. 119 of 1986)) and for other purposes. (Repealed by Statute Law Revision (Repeals) Act 1999 (No. 3 of 1999))
La Trobe University (Bendigo and Wodonga) Act 1990	No. 91 of 1990	18 December 1990
An Act to establish the La Trobe University College of Northern Victoria and dissolve the Bendigo College of Advanced Education, to provide for the merger of the Wodonga Institute of Tertiary Education with La Trobe University, to amend the La Trobe University Act 1964 (Note: La Trobe University Act 1964 (No. 7189)) and for other purposes.
Mineral Resources Development Act 1990 or the Mineral Resources (Sustainable Development) Act 1990 or the Mineral Resources and Extractive Industries Act 1990	No. 92 of 1990	18 December 1990
An Act to provide a new legislative framework for the use of mineral resources in the State, to repeal the Mines Act 1958, (Note: Mines Act 1958 (No. 6320)) to make consequential amendments to other legislation and for other purposes.
State Bank (Succession of Commonwealth Bank) Act 1990	No. 94 of 1990	18 December 1990
An Act to give effect to an Agreement between the State and the Commonwealth Bank for the succession of the Commonwealth Bank to the State Bank, to repeal the State Bank Act 1988, (Note: State Bank Act 1988 (No. 29 of 1988)) to make consequential amendments to certain other Acts and for other purposes.
Audit (Amendment) Act 1990	No. X of 1990	
Building, Co-operative Housing and Friendly Societies (Amendment) Act 1990 (repealed)	No. 36 of 1990	
(Repealed by Statute Law Revision (Repeals) Act 1999 (No. 3 of 1999))
Business Franchise Acts (Further Amendment) Act 1990	No. X of 1990	
Children and Young Persons (Amendment) Act 1990 (repealed)	No. 93 of 1990	
(Repealed by Statute Law Revision (Repeals) Act 1999 (No. 3 of 1999))
Chiropractors and Osteopaths (Amendment) Act 1990 (repealed)	No. 75 of 1990	
(Repealed by Statute Law Revision (Repeals) Act 1999 (No. 3 of 1999))
Co-operative Housing Societies (Guarantees) Act 1990 (repealed)	No. 30 of 1990	
(Repealed by Statute Law Revision (Repeals) Act 1999 (No. 3 of 1999))
Community Protection Act 1990	No. X of 1990	
Courts (Amendment) Act 1990 (repealed)	No. 64 of 1990	
(Repealed by Statute Law Revision (Repeals) Act 1999 (No. 3 of 1999))
Courts (Children's and Magistrates') Act 1990	No. X of 1990	
Crimes (Family Violence) (Amendment) Act 1990 (repealed)	No. 17 of 1990	
(Repealed by Statute Law Revision (Repeals) Act 1999 (No. 3 of 1999))
Crimes (Unsworn Statements) Act 1990 (repealed)	No. 35 of 1990	
(Repealed by Statute Law Revision (Repeals) Act 1999 (No. 3 of 1999))
Cultural and Recreational Lands (Amendment) Act 1990 (repealed)	No. 3 of 1990	
(Repealed by Statute Law Revision (Repeals) Act 1999 (No. 3 of 1999))
Dentists (Amendment) Act 1990	No. X of 1990	
Drugs, Poisons and Controlled Substances (Amendment) Act 1990 (repealed)	No. 25 of 1990	
(Repealed by Statute Law Revision (Repeals) Act 1999 (No. 3 of 1999))
Education (Amendment) Act 1990 (repealed)	No. 2 of 1990	
(Repealed by Statute Law (Further Revision) Act 2006 (No. 29 of 2006))
Environment Protection (Fees and Penalties) Act 1990	No. X of 1990	
Evidence (Amendment) Act 1990	No. X of 1990	
Farm Produce Wholesale Act 1990	No. X of 1990	
Financial Institutions Duty (Further Amendment) Act 1990	No. X of 1990	
Fisheries (Abalone Licence Charges) (Amendment) Act 1990 (repealed)	No. 4 of 1990	
(Repealed by Statute Law Revision (Repeals) Act 1999 (No. 3 of 1999))
Fisheries (Abalone Licence Charges) Act 1990	No. X of 1990	
Fisheries (Shark Fishery) Act 1990	No. X of 1990	
Food (Validation) Act 1990	No. X of 1990	
Footscray Land (Amendment) Act 1990 (repealed)	No. 38 of 1990	
(Repealed by Statute Law Revision Act 2013 (No. 70 of 2013)
Forests (Timber Harvesting) Act 1990	No. X of 1990	
Freedom of Information (Amendment) Act 1990	No. X of 1990	
Health (Amendment) Act 1990 (repealed)	No. 1 of 1990	
(Repealed by Statute Law Revision (Repeals) Act 1999 (No. 3 of 1999))
Health (Radiographers) Act 1990	No. X of 1990	
Health Services (Amendment) Act 1990	No. X of 1990	
Health Services (Conciliation and Review) (Amendment) Act 1990 (repealed)	No. 69 of 1990	
(Repealed by Statute Law Revision (Repeals) Act 1999 (No. 3 of 1999))
Health Services (Further Amendment) Act 1990 (repealed)	No. 53 of 1990	
(Repealed by Statute Law Revision (Repeals) Act 1999 (No. 3 of 1999))
House Contracts Guarantee (Further Amendment) Act 1990	No. X of 1990	
Juries (Amendment) Act 1990 (repealed)	No. 61 of 1990	
(Repealed by Statute Law Revision (Repeals) Act 1999 (No. 3 of 1999))
Kew and Heidelberg Lands (Trust) Act 1990 (repealed)	No. 16 of 1990	
(Repealed by Statute Law Repeals Act 2012 (No. 30 of 2012))
Land (Further Miscellaneous Matters) Act 1990	No. X of 1990	
Land Conservation (Amendment) Act 1990	No. X of 1990	
Land Tax (Amendment) Act 1990	No. X of 1990	
Liquor Control (Fees) Act 1990	No. X of 1990	
Liquor Control (Packaged Liquor Licences) Act 1990	No. X of 1990	
Local Government (Amendment) Act 1990	No. X of 1990	
Magistrates' Court (Amendment) Act 1990 (repealed)	No. 49 of 1990	
(Repealed by Statute Law Revision (Repeals) Act 1999 (No. 3 of 1999))
Margarine (Amendment) Act 1990 (repealed)	No. 89 of 1990	
(Repealed by Statute Law Revision (Repeals) Act 1999 (No. 3 of 1999))
Martial Arts Control (Amendment) Act 1990 (repealed)	No. 85 of 1990	
(Repealed by Statute Law Revision (Repeals) Act 1999 (No. 3 of 1999))
Medical Treatment (Enduring Power of Attorney) Act 1990	No. X of 1990	
Mental Health (General Amendment) Act 1990 (repealed)	No. 32 of 1990	
(Repealed by Statute Law Revision (Repeals) Act 1999 (No. 3 of 1999))
Mildura College Lands (Amendment) Act 1990	No. X of 1990	
Murray-Darling Basin (Amendment) Act 1990	No. X of 1990	
National Parks (Further Amendment) Act 1990 (repealed)	No. 43 of 1990	
(Repealed by Legislation Reform (Repeals No. 2) Act 2008 (No. 16 of 2008))
Occupational Health and Safety (Miscellaneous Amendment) Act 1990 (repealed)	No. 11 of 1990	
(Repealed by Statute Law Revision (Repeals) Act 1999 (No. 3 of 1999))
Pay-roll Tax (Amendment) Act 1990 (repealed)	No. 56 of 1990	
(Repealed by Statute Law Revision (Repeals) Act 1999 (No. 3 of 1999))
Petroleum (Submerged Lands) (Amendment) Act 1990 (repealed)	No. 12 of 1990	
(Repealed by Legislation Reform (Repeals No. 2) Act 2008 (No. 16 of 2008))
Petroleum (Submerged Lands) (Further Amendment) Act 1990 (repealed)	No. 83 of 1990	
(Repealed by Statute Law Revision (Repeals) Act 1999 (No. 3 of 1999))
Police Regulation (Further Amendment) Act 1990 (repealed)	No. 42 of 1990	
(Repealed by Legislation Reform (Repeals No. 3) Act 2008 (No. 53 of 2008))
Private Agents (Amendment) Act 1990 (repealed)	No. 37 of 1990	
(Repealed by Statute Law (Further Revision) Act 2006 (No. 29 of 2006))
Road Safety (Amendment) Act 1990 (repealed)	No. 5 of 1990	
(Repealed by Legislation Reform (Repeals No. 2) Act 2008 (No. 16 of 2008))
Road Safety (Certificates) Act 1990	No. X of 1990	
Shop Trading (Amendment) Act 1990 (repealed)	No. 29 of 1990	
(Repealed by Statute Law Revision (Repeals) Act 1999 (No. 3 of 1999))
Shop Trading (Butcher's Shops) Act 1990 (repealed)	No. 67 of 1990	
(Repealed by Statute Law Revision (Repeals) Act 1999 (No. 3 of 1999))
Superannuation Acts (Miscellaneous Amendments) Act 1990 (repealed)	No. 72 of 1990	
(Repealed by Statute Law Revision (Repeals) Act 1999 (No. 3 of 1999))
Sustainable Energy Authority Victoria Act 1990	No. X of 1990	
Teaching Service (Amendment) Act 1990 (repealed)	No. 77 of 1990	
(Repealed by Statute Law Revision (Repeals) Act 1999 (No. 3 of 1999))
Transport (Anti-Graffiti) Act 1990 (repealed)	No. 81 of 1990	
(Repealed by Statute Law Revision (Repeals) Act 1999 (No. 3 of 1999))
Victorian Debt Retirement Fund Act 1990 (repealed)	No. 87 of 1990	
(Repealed by Treasury Legislation (Repeal) Act 2005 (No. 73 of 2005))
Wildlife (Amendment) Act 1990	No. X of 1990	
Yackandandah Land Act 1990	No. X of 1990	

== Sources ==
- "1990 Victorian Historical Acts". AustLII.
