= Technical and further education =

Vocational education system in Australia

Technical and further education (TAFE; /ˈteɪf/) is the common name in Australia for vocational education, as a subset of tertiary education. TAFE institutions provide a wide range of predominantly vocational courses.

Individual TAFE institutions (usually with numerous campuses) are known as either colleges or institutes, depending on the state or territory.

In Australia, where the term TAFE originated, institutions usually host qualifying courses, under the National Training System/Australian Qualifications Framework/VET Quality Framework. Fields covered include business, finance, hospitality, tourism, construction, engineering, visual arts, information technology and community work. TAFE colleges are owned, operated and financed by the various state/territory governments.

== Qualifications awarded by TAFE colleges ==
TAFE colleges award Australian Qualifications Framework (AQF) qualifications accredited in the Vocational Education and Training (VET) sector that align to Certificate I, Certificate II, Certificate III, Certificate IV, Diploma, Advanced Diploma, Graduate Certificate and Graduate Diploma qualifications. In many instances, such as at UNSW and Southern Cross University, TAFE study at a Diploma or above level can be used as partial credit towards bachelor's degree-level university programs.

From 2002 the TAFE education sector has been able to offer bachelor's degrees and post-graduate diploma courses to fill niche areas, particularly vocationally focused areas of study based on industry needs. As of June 2009, ten TAFE colleges (mainly in New South Wales and Victoria, but also Western Australia, ACT, and Queensland) now confer their own degree-level awards and post graduate diplomas, though initially not beyond the level of bachelor's degree. However Melbourne Polytechnic was accredited in 2015 to offer two master's degree courses. Similarly, some universities (e.g., Charles Darwin University, and Royal Melbourne Institute of Technology) offer vocational education courses (traditionally the domain of TAFE); these are funded by the local state and territory governments. Some high schools also deliver courses developed and accredited by TAFEs.

Students who enrol in these undergraduate degree courses at TAFE are required to pay full fees and are not entitled to Commonwealth Government supported student fee loans, known as HECS loans, but may access a FEE-HELP loan scheme. While Universities have the ability and power to design and offer their own degree courses, each TAFE degree course must be assessed and approved by the Higher Education Accreditation Committee (HEAC).

TAFEs in some states can also teach senior high school qualifications, like the Victorian Certificate of Education, Victorian Certificate of Applied Learning, and the Higher School Certificate. Some universities, e.g. Charles Darwin University and Royal Melbourne Institute of Technology, offer TAFE courses; these are funded by the local state and territory governments. Some high schools also deliver courses developed and accredited by TAFEs.

Some private institutions also offer courses from TAFEs, however they more commonly offer other vocational education and training courses. Before the 1990s, the TAFEs had a near monopoly in the sector. TAFE courses provide students an opportunity for certificate, diploma, and advanced diploma qualifications in a wide range of areas.

== TAFE colleges by state/territory ==
In most cases, TAFE campuses are grouped into TAFE institutions or institutes along geographic lines. Most TAFEs are given a locally recognised region of the country where they exclusively operate covering a wide range of subjects.

A few TAFEs specialise in a single area of study. These are usually found near the middle of the capital cities, and they service the whole state or territory. For example, the TAFE Queensland SkillsTech in Brisbane, from 1 July 2006, has specialised in automotive, building and construction, manufacturing and engineering, and electrical/electronic studies for students throughout Queensland and the William Angliss Institute of TAFE in Melbourne has specialised in food, hospitality and tourism courses for Victoria.

=== Australian Capital Territory ===
In the Australian Capital Territory, these include:

- Canberra Institute of Technology

=== New South Wales ===
There were ten TAFE NSW Institutes in NSW, which have since been joined into a state-wide service. OTEN or TAFE Digital is TAFE's online offering.

=== Northern Territory ===
In the Northern Territory, these include:

- Charles Darwin University
- Batchelor Institute of Indigenous Tertiary Education

=== Queensland ===
In Queensland, TAFE Queensland is the largest training provider in the state, with more than 60 locations in Queensland. In May 2014, the TAFE institutes amalgamated into six regions of the central TAFE Queensland (parent body). The regions of TAFE Queensland were:

- Brisbane (formerly Brisbane North Institute of TAFE, Metropolitan South Institute of TAFE and Southbank Institute of Technology)
- Gold Coast (formerly Gold Coast Institute of TAFE)
- East Coast (formerly Sunshine Coast Institute of TAFE and Wide Bay Institute of TAFE)
- South West (formerly Bremer Institute of TAFE and Southern Queensland Institute of TAFE)
- North (formerly Barrier Reef Institute of TAFE, Mount Isa Institute of TAFE and Tropical North Queensland TAFE)
- SkillsTech (formerly SkillsTech Australia)
- TAFE Queensland Online (TOL)

And as of the 1 July 2014, Central Queensland TAFE (branded as CQ TAFE) was merged into Central Queensland University (branded as CQUniversity) to create Queensland's first dual sector university.

From 1 July 2017 TAFE Queensland commenced the process of consolidating the previous six regional institutions into a single institute or Registered Training Organisation (RTO).

=== South Australia ===
In South Australia:

- TAFE SA

=== Tasmania ===
In Tasmania, there are two government TAFE organisations:

- TasTAFE includes:
  - Institute of TAFE Tasmania (general)
  - Drysdale Institute (for tourism and hospitality)
- Australian Maritime College TAFE (maritime studies)

=== Victoria ===
In Victoria these include:

- Bendigo Regional Institute of TAFE (Local: Bendigo-Echuca)
- Box Hill Institute of TAFE (Local: Eastern Melbourne, Specialist: Short courses)
- Chisholm Institute (Local: South East Melbourne)
- East Gippsland Institute of TAFE (Local: East Gippsland)
- Central Gippsland Institute of TAFE (Local: West and South Gippsland, Specialist: High-voltage electrical)
- Federation University (Local: Ballarat and Horsham - Central Highlands/Wimmera, Specialist: Agriculture & Horticulture, Building & Construction, Business & IT, Community Services, Food & Hospitality, Hair & Beauty, Manufacturing Engineering)
- Gordon Institute of TAFE (Local: Geelong)
- Goulburn Ovens Institute of TAFE (Local: North East Victoria)
- Holmesglen Institute of TAFE (Local: Eastern Melbourne)
- Kangan Institute (Local: North West Melbourne, Specialist: Automotive, Fashion)
- Melbourne Polytechnic (Local: Northern and inner East Melbourne, Specialist: Equine, Aquaculture, Agriculture, Viticulture, Music)
- RMIT University (Specialist: Various)
- South West Institute of TAFE (Local: Western District)
- Sunraysia Institute of TAFE (Local: North West Victoria)
- Swinburne University of Technology (Local: Eastern Melbourne)
- Victoria University (Local: Western Melbourne)
- William Angliss Institute of TAFE (Specialist: Hospitality)
- Wodonga Institute of TAFE (Local: Wodonga, Specialist: Driving)
- The University of Melbourne discontinued its TAFE arm (which specialised in agriculture and forestry) at the start of 2007.

=== Western Australia ===
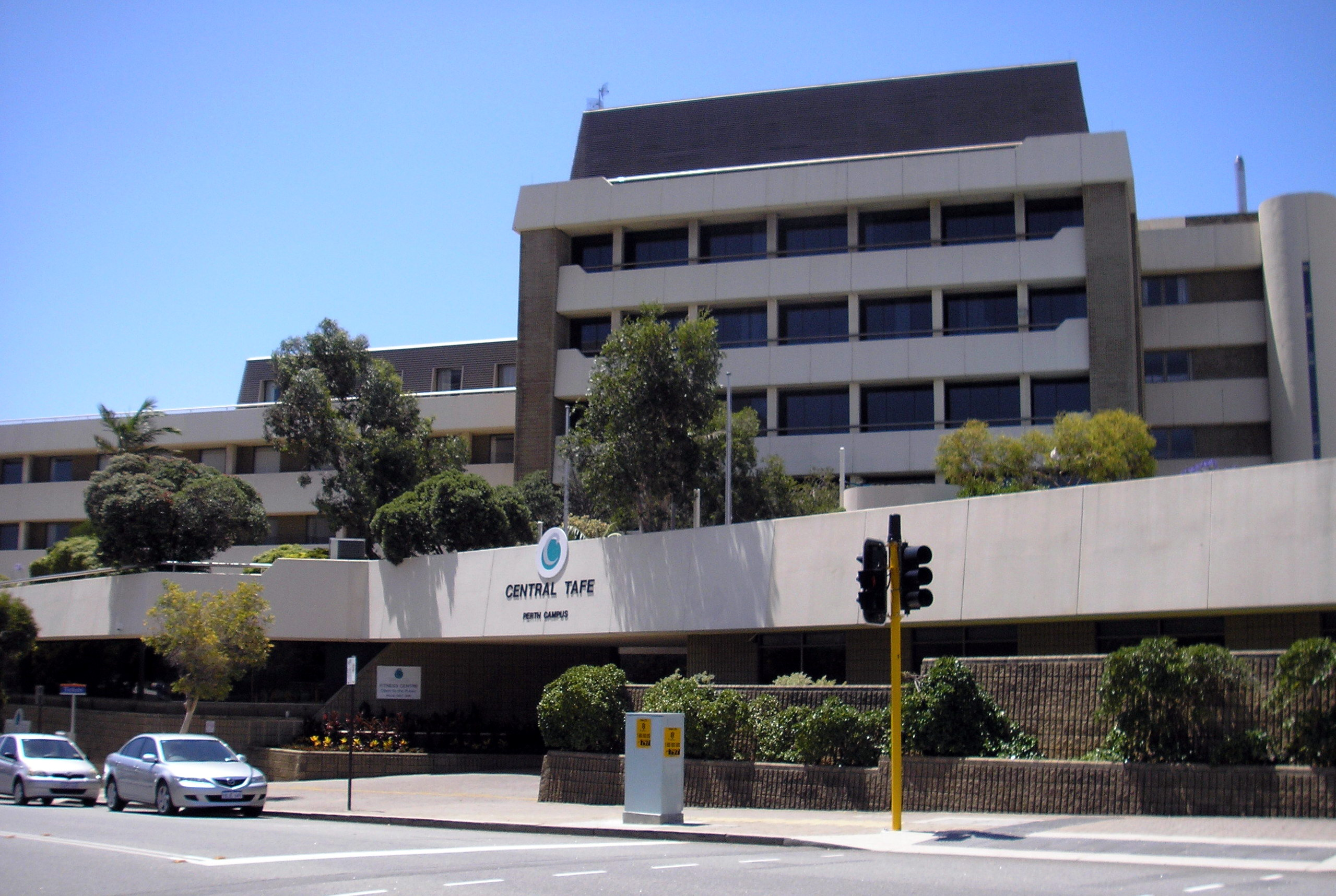
North Metropolitan TAFE Perth campus

In Western Australia, this includes:

- North Metropolitan TAFE (Formerly Central Institute of Technology & West Coast Institute of Training)
- South Metropolitan TAFE (Formerly Challenger Institute of Technology & Polytechnic West)
- Central Regional TAFE (Formerly Durack Institute of Technology, Goldfields Institute of Technology & C. Y. O'Connor Institute)
- South Regional TAFE (Formerly South West Institute of Technology & Great Southern Institute of Technology)
- North Regional TAFE (Formerly Kimberley TAFE & Pilbara Institute)

== See also ==
- Education in Australia
- Further education
- Registered training organisation
- TAFE Outreach
