= North Metropolitan TAFE =

Technical college in Perth, Western Australia

- Other names: NMTAFE; North Metro TAFE
- Former names: Balga Technical School; Carine Technical School; Central Institute of Technology; Central Metropolitan College of TAFE; Claremont School of Art; Midland College of TAFE; North Metropolitan College of TAFE; Perth Technical School; Swan TAFE; Trades North; WA School of Nursing; West Coast College of TAFE; West Coast Institute; West Coast Institute of Training; West Coast TAFE
- Type: TAFE
- Established: 1900
- Chairperson: Mara West (Governing Council chair)
- Director: Michelle Hoad (Managing Director)
- Academic staff: 805
- Administrative staff: 450
- Students: 30,000
- Location: Perth, Western Australia, Australia
- Campus: Balga; Clarkson; East Perth; Joondalup (Kendrew Crescent); Joondalup (McLarty Avenue); Leederville; Midland; Mount Lawley; Nedlands (Oral Health Centre of Western Australia); Perth
- Website: www.northmetrotafe.wa.edu.au

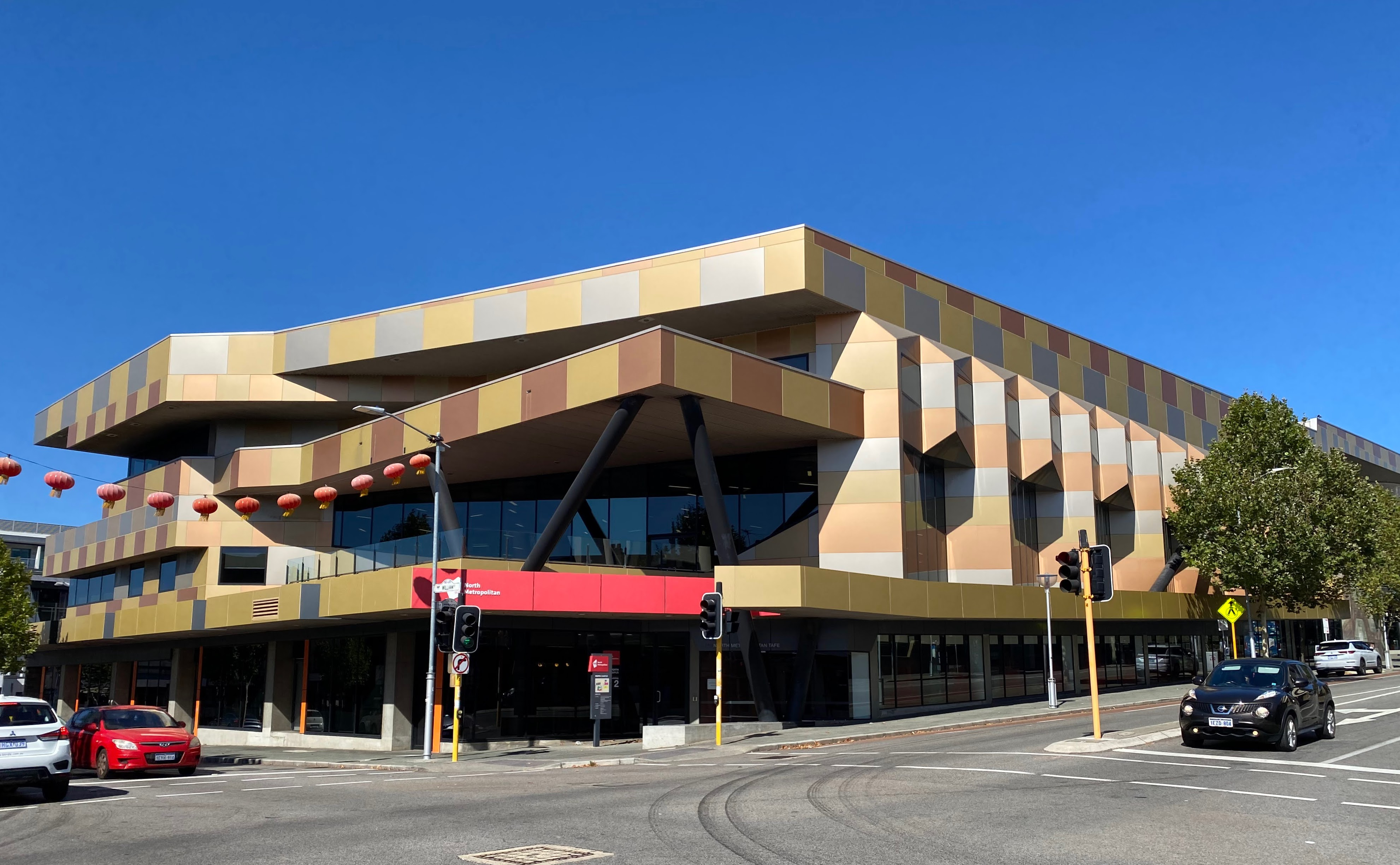
30 Aberdeen Street campus

North Metropolitan TAFE is a state government-funded educational institution delivering Technical and Further Education (TAFE). It services the northern suburbs of Perth across ten campuses. North Metropolitan TAFE was formed on 11 April 2016, when the Government of Western Australia announced after the Independent Review of the Vocational Education and Training Sector in Western Australia, that the 11 State Training Providers would be streamlined and form five new TAFE colleges in Western Australia. This resulted in the merging of Central Institute and West Coast Institute to form North Metropolitan TAFE.

At the beginning of 2017, two campuses (Balga and Midland) that were formerly part of Polytechnic West also joined North Metropolitan TAFE.

North Metropolitan TAFE has about 1250 (casual, part-time, full-time) staff that collaborate with local industry to ensure that courses are meeting the demands of students wanting to enter the workforce with up-to-date, industry-specific, practical skills. As of 2021, there were 29,979 students enrolled in approximately 350 Vocational Education and Training (VET) courses covering a number of industry areas.

== Courses ==
North Metropolitan TAFE offers courses that are nationally recognised VET courses under the Australian Quality Training Framework (AQTF). Students can study qualifications at a variety of levels, including:

- Course
- Certificate I
- Certificate II
- Certificate III
- Certificate IV
- Diploma
- Advanced Diploma

Qualifications can be studied full-time or part-time, and are delivered on campus (in classrooms or laboratories) or online (self-paced study) or as a combination (online and on campus). Components of qualifications can also be studied as Short Courses or Skill Sets over a few weeks. Some courses allow students to enrol as an apprentice or trainee, resulting in part of the training for the course being completed “on the job”.

North Metropolitan TAFE courses can, in some instances, prepare students for university studies. North Metropolitan TAFE have arrangements in place with local Western Australian universities and national higher education providers so that credits/advanced standing can be applied to units completed at TAFE.

The industry areas that North Metropolitan TAFE has courses covering include:

- Automotive (Automotive Air Conditioning, Automotive Electrical, Automotive Manufacturing, Trimming, Vehicle Servicing)
- Building and Construction (Bricklaying, Carpentry and Joinery, Electrotechnology, Fabrication, Painting and Signcraft, Plumbing, Residential Building Drafting, Solid Plastering Tiling)
- Business and Finance (Accounting, Bookkeeping, Business Administration, Human Resource Management, Leadership, Legal Services, Marketing, Project Management, Response and Operational Services, Retail)
- Creative Industries (Animation, Digital Art, Digital Cinema, Fashion and Textile Design, Game Art, Graphic Design, Interior Design, Jewellery, Film and Television, Broadcast Radio, Music, Photography, Product Design, Visual Arts)
- Education and Community Services (Counselling, Early Childhood Education and Care, Education Support, Languages, Mental Health, School Based Education Support, Training and Assessment, Youth Work)
- Engineering (Civil Construction, Fluid Power, Instrumentation, Mechanical Trade, Metal Fabrication)
- Languages and Foundation Studies (Auslan, English, Foreign Languages, General Education, Interpreting)
- Health and Beauty (Aged Care, Allied Health, Anaesthetic Technology, Beauty Therapy, Dental, Disability Services, Fitness, Hairdressing, Massage Therapy, Nursing, Pathology, Sport)
- Hospitality (Baking and Patisserie, Commercial Cookery, Events, Tourism, Travel)
- Information technology (Cyber Security, Data and Voice Communications, Library, Networking and Security, Programming, Robotics, Web Development)
- Logistics (Supply Chain Operations)
- Mining (Exploration, Resource Processing, Surface Operations, Surveying)
- Science and Environment (Conservation, Ecosystem Management, Environmental Science, Horticulture, Laboratory Operations)

== Campuses ==
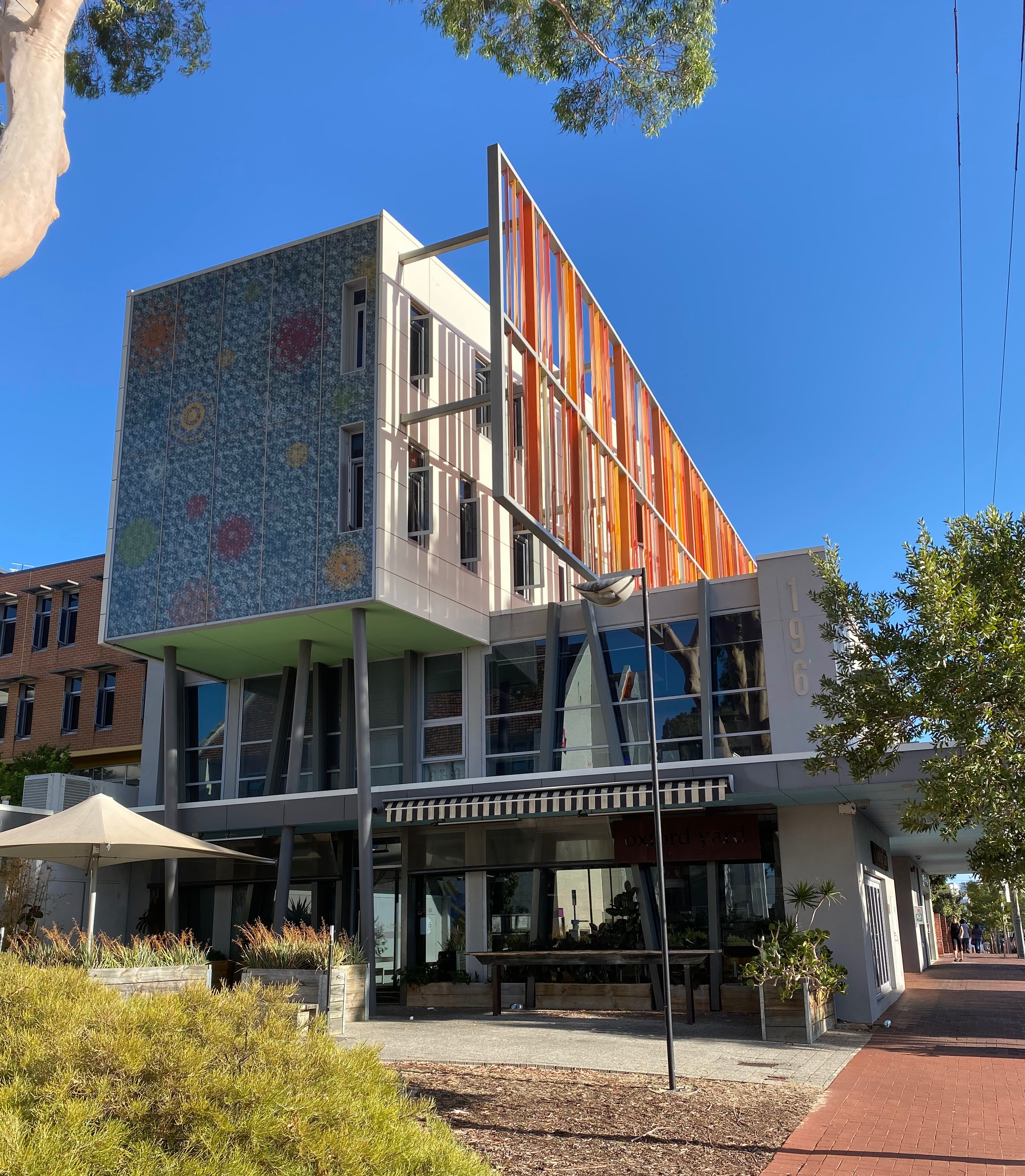
The Leederville campus

In the suburb of Perth, North Metropolitan TAFE has its main campus within the area bound by Newcastle Street, William Street, Francis Street and Beaufort Street, just to the north of the State Library of Western Australia and Perth Cultural Centre.

In East Perth, North Metropolitan TAFE’s campus comprises the Mining Training Centre and the newly renovated Green Skills Training Centre, which is completely self-sufficient in energy and water, earning it a 6 star Green Rating for design by the Green Building Council of Australia.

At the Leederville campus of North Metropolitan TAFE Human Services type courses are catered for. This campus also has a professional recording studio and live performance venue with full staging, lighting and sound production. The building was formerly a sanatorium Known as North Perth tuberculosis hospital but was renovated in 1977 with the addition of a blocks B, C and D.

Similarly, the Mount Lawley campus of North Metropolitan TAFE has courses with a focus on health services.

In conjunction with the University of Western Australia, North Metropolitan TAFE has a campus for its Dental courses in Nedlands, at the Oral Health Centre of Western Australia.

The North Metropolitan TAFE campuses in Balga and Midland were formerly part of South Metropolitan TAFE (in 2016) and prior to that they were part of Polytechnic West, which was formerly known as Swan TAFE. The Balga campus was originally known as the Balga Technical School and was established in the early 1970s.

To the north of the Perth metropolitan area, in the suburb of Joondalup, North Metropolitan TAFE has two campuses on Kendrew Crescent and on McLarty Avenue. The Kendrew Crescent campus was the main campus of the former West Coast Institute, built in 1992. The McLarty Avenue campus, also referred to as the Health and Wellness Training Campus, has a simulation hospital to assist with nursing and other health courses, and is situated close to the Joondalup Health Campus.

Further north in Clarkson, North Metropolitan TAFE has its Trades Training Centre to cater for various building and construction courses. This campus was formerly known as Trades North, which was part of West Coast Institute.
