= University of Melbourne, Dookie campus =

Agricultural school of the University of Melbourne

Coordinates: 36.384°S 145.707°E

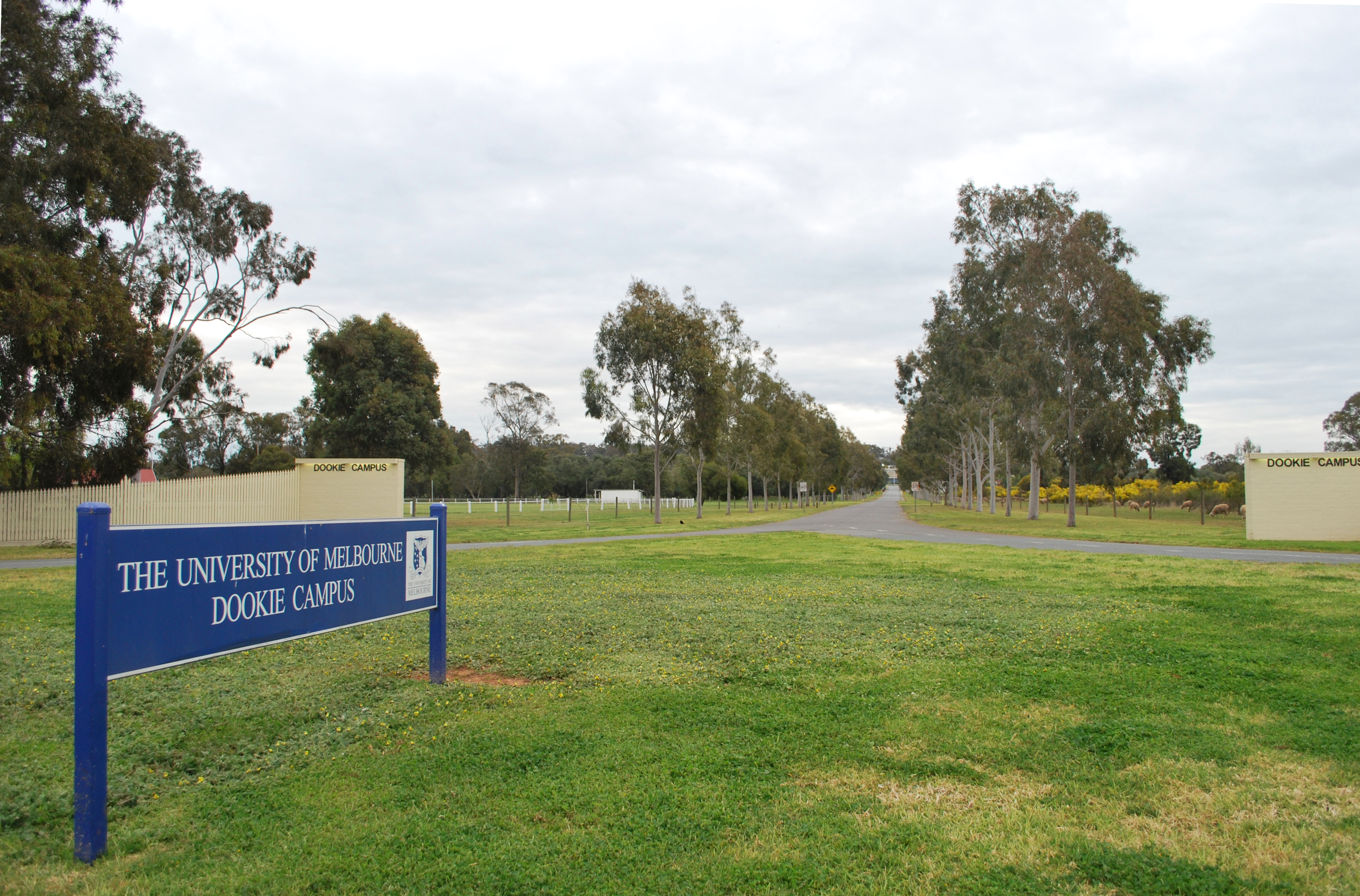
Entrance of Dookie Campus

Melbourne University, Dookie campus (formerly known as Dookie Agricultural College) is an agricultural campus of Melbourne University near the town of Dookie, Victoria. It is the oldest agricultural college in Victoria.

The campus has a broadacre farm, dairy farm, orchard and winery, alongside teaching facilities, supporting both research and the university's Bachelor of Agriculture and other courses delivered there.

It was established as the Dookie Agricultural College on 4 October 1886, operated by the Council of Agricultural Education. The establishment followed a decade of discussion about the possibility of establishing an agricultural college, with the pre-existing Dookie Experimental Farm site reserved in 1875. It was the first of a planned series of agricultural colleges in Victoria and at its opening, had forty students undertaking a three-year course.

The college became a College of Advanced Education with the introduction of CAEs in 1967. It was amalgamated into the multi-campus Victorian College of Agriculture and Horticulture in 1983. It was then amalgamated with the University of Melbourne in 1997, becoming the university's Dookie campus.
