= Central Institute of Technology =

Former tertiary education institution in Perth, Western Australia

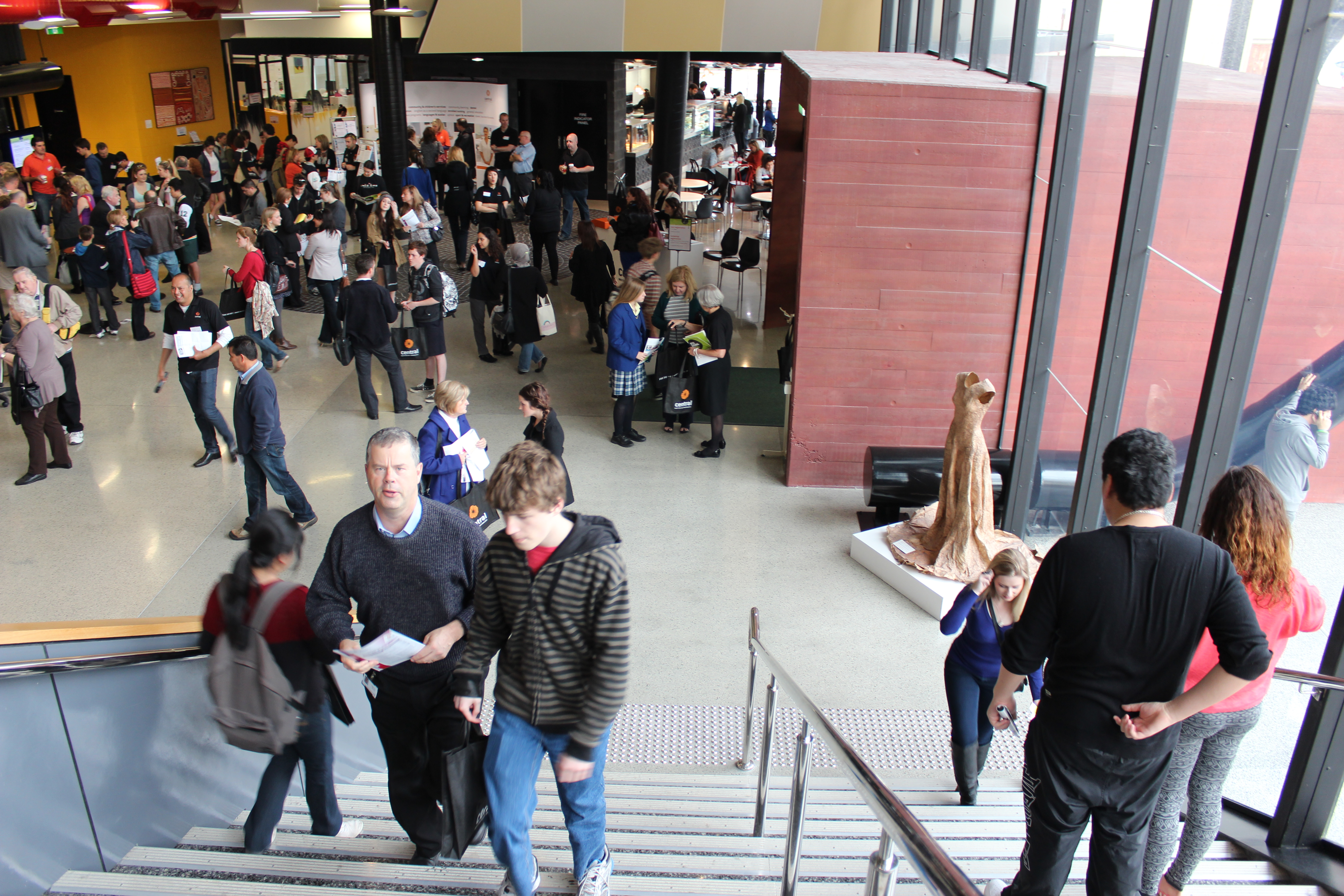
- Students entering 30 Aberdeen Street
- Type: Technical and further education
- Active: 1900–2016
- Chairman: Lance Twomey
- Location: Perth, Western Australia, Australia; 31.9481°S 115.861°E
- Campus: Perth; Leederville; East Perth (eCentral); Mount Lawley; Nedlands
- Website: www.central.wa.edu.au

Central Institute of Technology was a Technical and Further Education (TAFE) institution based in Perth, Western Australia until 2016, at which point it became a part of North Metropolitan TAFE. It was the equal oldest post-secondary educational institution in Western Australia and the largest TAFE institution in Perth.

Historically it was also known by the names of Perth Technical College, Central Metropolitan College of TAFE (CMC) and Central TAFE. On 11 April 2016, following a reform of all TAFE colleges in Western Australia, Central Institute of Technology amalgamated with West Coast Institute of Training into North Metropolitan TAFE.

== Campuses and facilities ==
The institute trained around 25,000 students each year and operated at five campuses in the Perth metropolitan area:

- Perth
- Leederville
- East Perth (eCentral)
- Mount Lawley
- Nedlands (Oral Health Care Centre of Western Australia)

Central Institute of Technology also catered for 1500 students from overseas each year and had offshore contracts for the delivery of Australian vocational qualifications in mainland China, Hong Kong, Mauritius, India and Kuwait.

Facilities at the main Northbridge campus included an art gallery and a simulated underground mine. East Perth campus, also known as eCentral, was one of the most technologically advanced campuses in Western Australia. The campus was partially powered by the largest single grid-connected solar system in the Perth central business district and one of the largest in the state. A new building at the East Perth campus provided facilities for training in the mining and renewable energy industries.

An alliance between Central Institute of Technology, the University of Western Australia and Curtin University resulted in the formation of the Oral Health Care Centre of Western Australia (OHCWA) in Nedlands.

In 2011, Central opened a A$62-million training facility at 30 Aberdeen Street, completing Central’s redevelopment of its city campus, linking all of the buildings in one education precinct. 30 Aberdeen Street housed training portfolios for the areas of engineering, architecture design and building and programs for the "lifestyle industries", including massage and beauty therapy treatment rooms.

All of Central's campuses were located in the Perth inner metropolitan area.

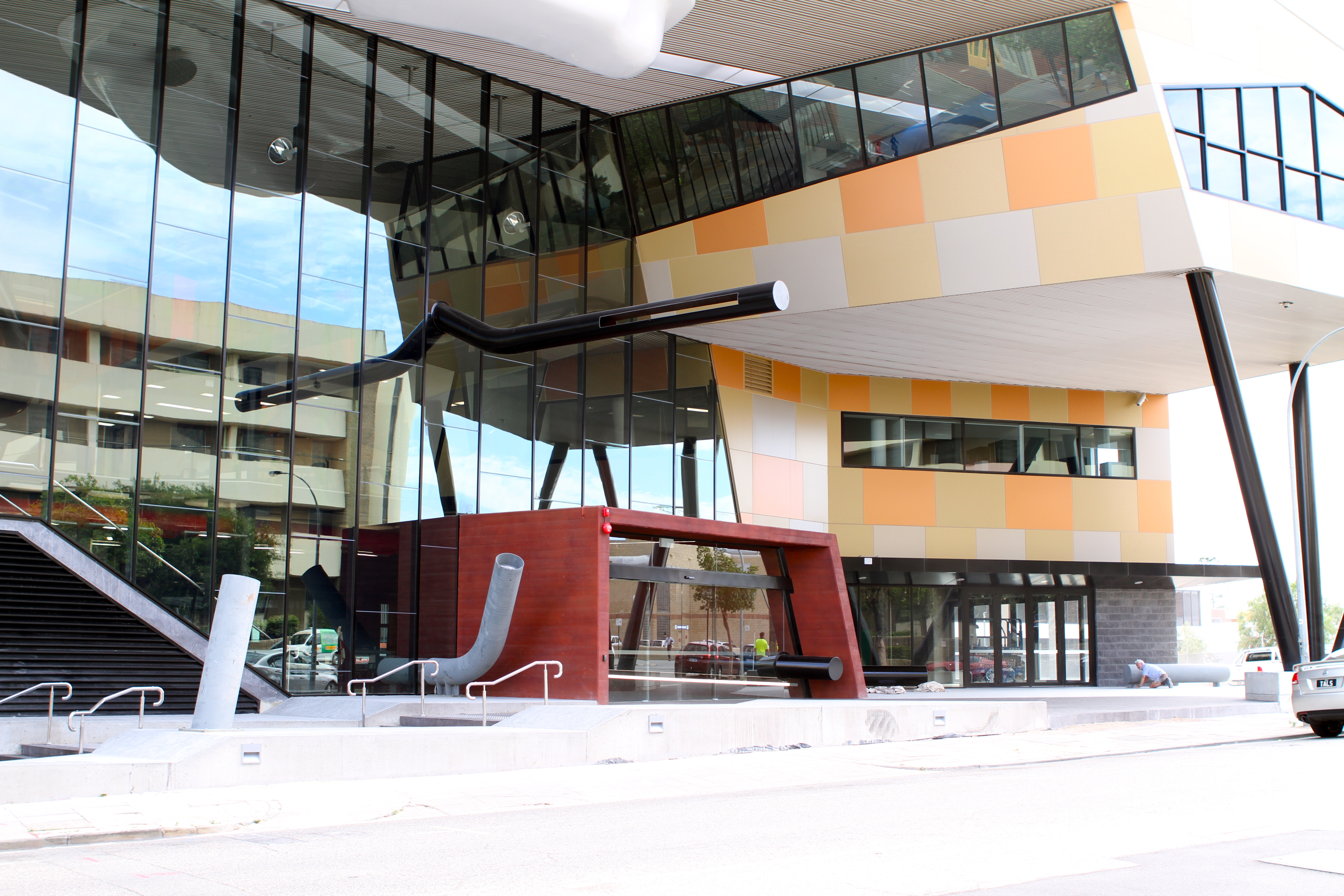
30 Aberdeen Street, Perth campus

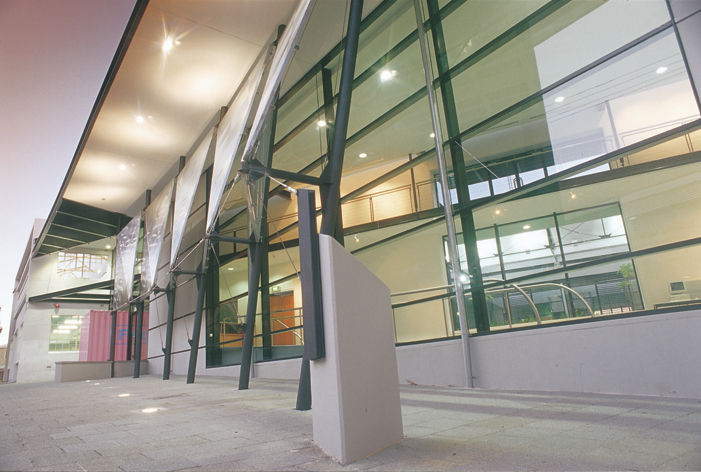
12 Aberdeen Street, Perth campus

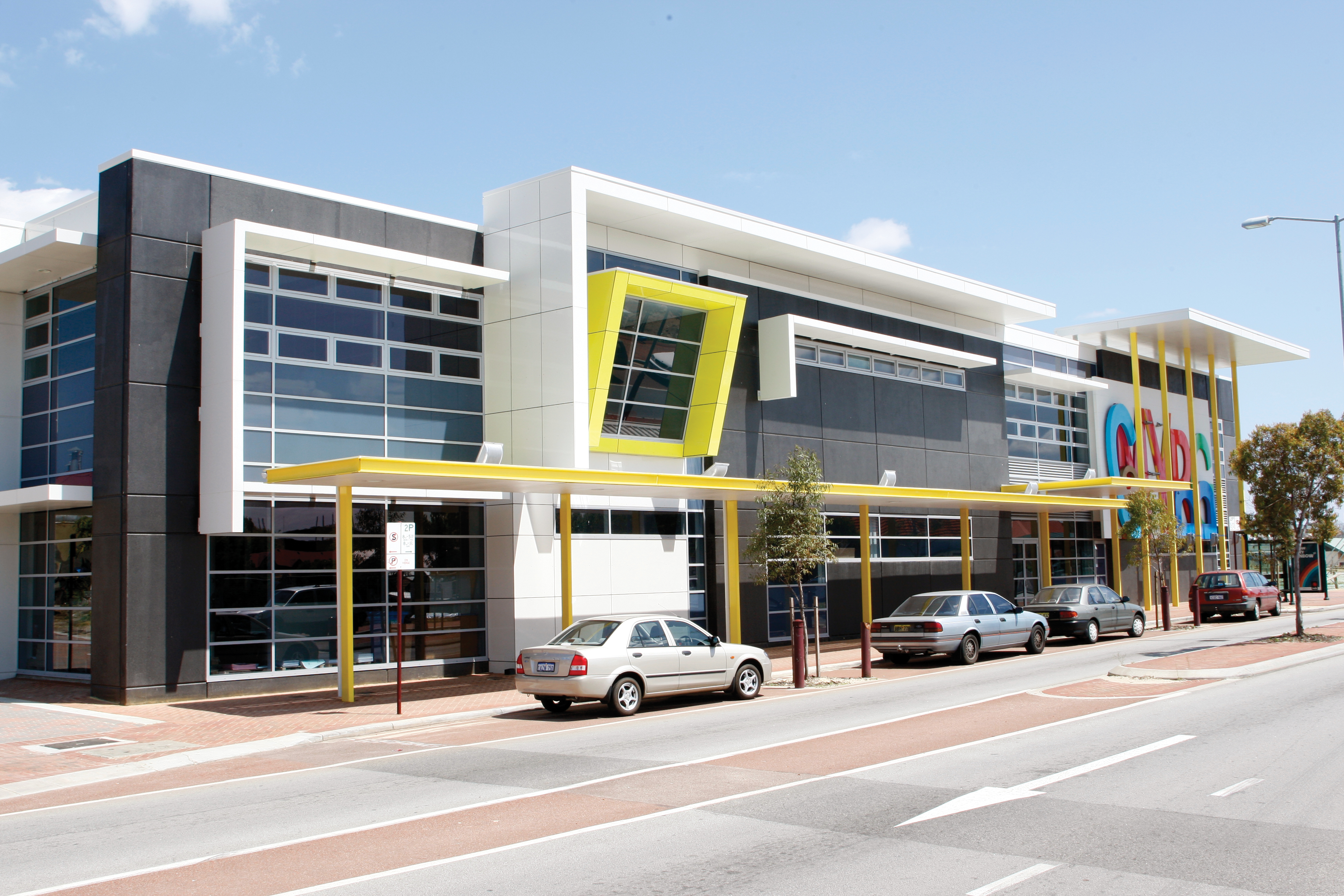
133 Newcastle Street, Perth campus

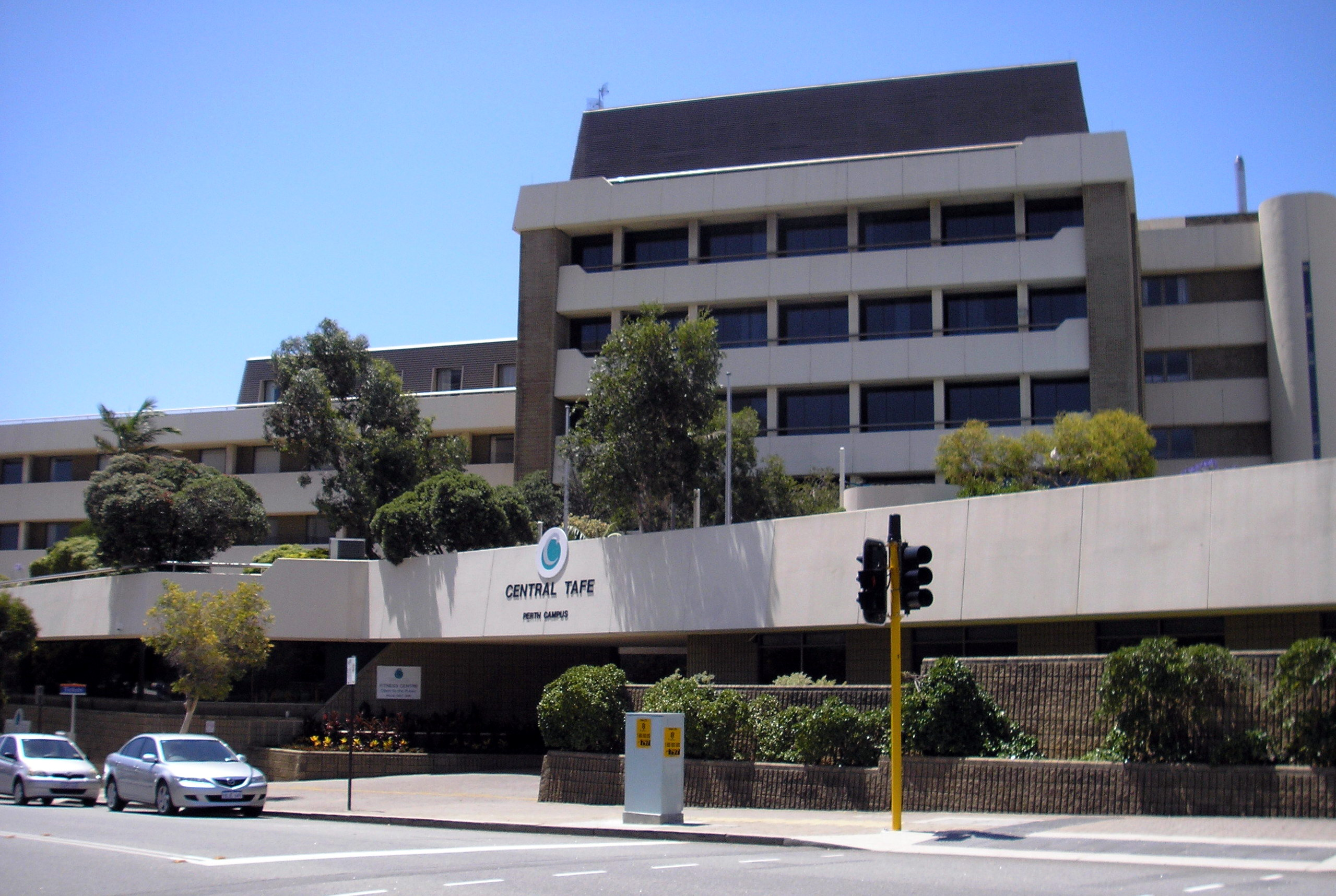
Main building, Perth campus

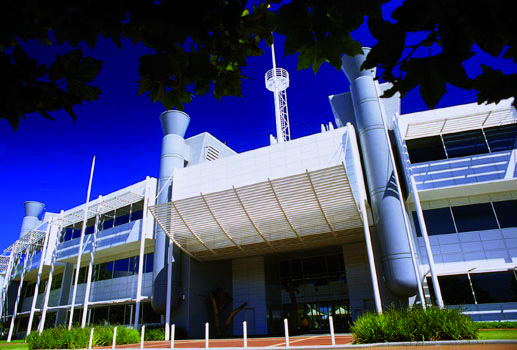
East Perth campus

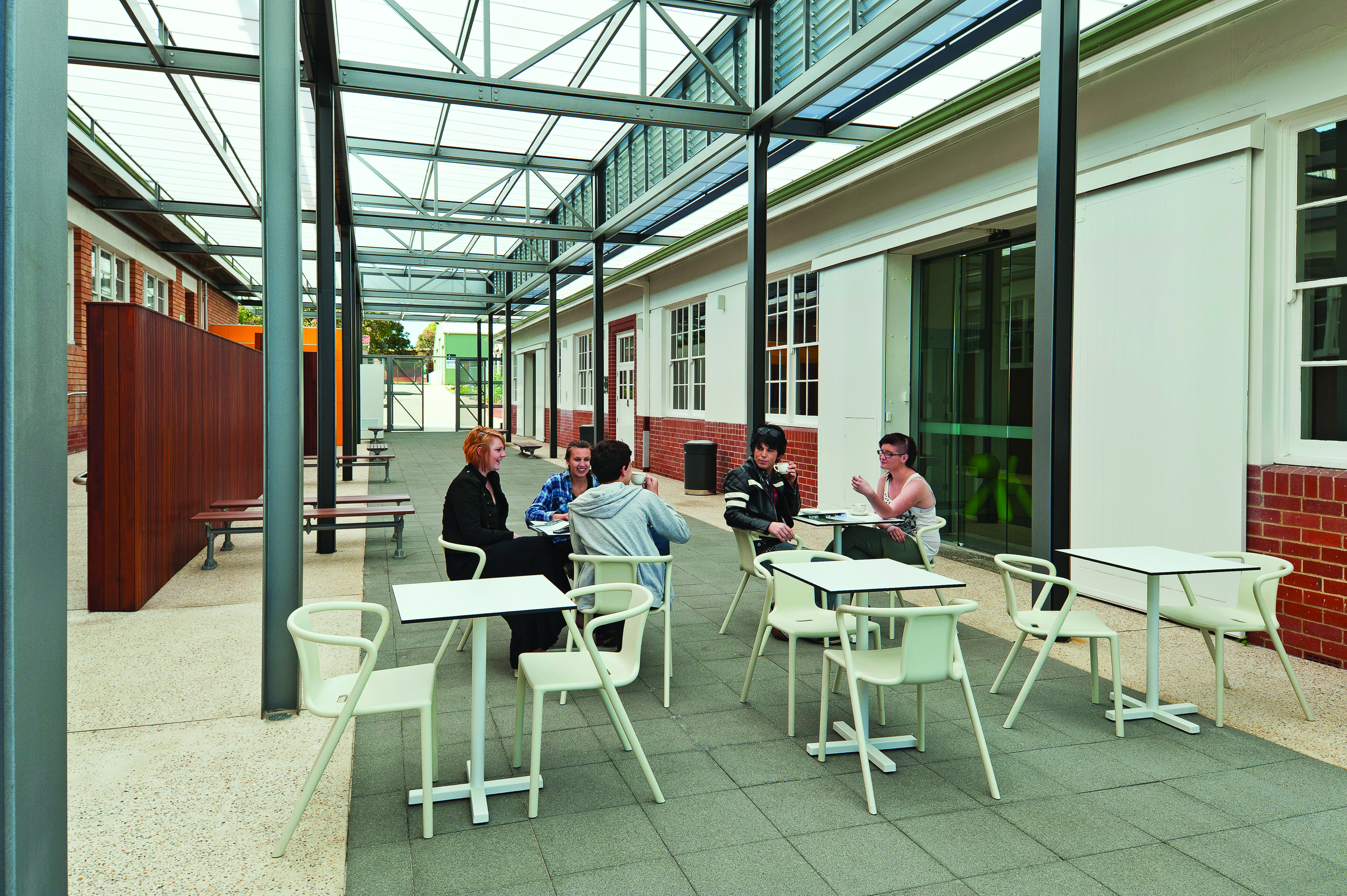
Leederville campus

== Courses ==
Central offered over 400 courses in areas including:

- Business, Management, Marketing, Real Estate, Legal and Finance
- Creative and Digital (Art, Design and Media; Information Technology and Information Services)
- Engineering and Building
- English and Community Access
- Health and Community Services
- Resources and Science and Sustainability
- Sport and Education
- Tourism and Languages

Central Institute of Technology award courses were in line with the Australian Quality Training Framework (AQTF). This framework establishes standard titles and levels for courses across Australia. The qualifications that were offered at Central include:

- Advanced Diploma
- Diploma
- Certificate IV
- Certificate III
- Certificate II
- Certificate I

Through its university pathway arrangements with Curtin University, The University of Western Australia (UWA), University of Notre Dame (UND), Murdoch University and Edith Cowan University (ECU), students could also gain access into university.

Central also offered a range of short courses and customised training for business.

== Structure and employees ==
Central had a governing council and employed 1,300 staff in lecturing and administrative positions in:

- Art and Design
- Applied Design
- Building, Design and Construction
- Management and Business
- Community and Children's Services
- Community Learning and Partnerships
- English as a Second Language (ESL)
- Digital Content
- Engineering
- Finance and Property Services
- Health and Lifestyle
- Media
- Science, Resources and Environment
- Sport, Education and Disability
- Tourism and Languages

== History ==
The Central Institute of Technology began as the Perth Technical School, holding its first classes from 16 May 1900 at the Old Perth Boys School and from various makeshift facilities along St Georges Terrace. The first enrollment was of 69 students in classes including chemistry, metallurgy, mineralogy, geology, woodwork, metalwork, art and design. In 1910 a purpose-built building was constructed to house the school.

Between 1905 and 1914, courses including pure mathematics, physics, chemistry and biology were taught at Perth Technical School on behalf of the University of Adelaide. This arrangement ceased in 1914 when the University of Western Australia became operational.

The school continued to grow in the following decades, establishing additional campuses and offering a growing list of qualifications. In 1966, the institution became more focused on vocational training when areas such as chemistry and metallurgy split away into the Western Australian Institute of Technology (WAIT) that eventually became Curtin University.

In 1990, the institute became the Central Metropolitan College of TAFE following the amalgamation of affiliated colleges at Perth, Leederville, Wembley and Mount Lawley, as well as the Claremont School of Art and the Western Australian School of Nursing. In late 2009 Central TAFE changed its name and branding to Central Institute of Technology.

The 1910 Perth Technical School building is listed in the Register of Heritage Places of the Heritage Council of Western Australia as part of the group of buildings which includes Newspaper House, the WA Trustee Co and the Royal Insurance buildings. It is also listed in the National Estate.

== Notable alumni and teachers ==
Notable alumni of the institute include: Walter James, 5th Premier of Western Australia (1902 to 1904); in the federal government Billy Mackie Snedden, 17th Attorney-General, 23rd Treasurer and Leader of the Opposition; architect William G. Bennett; pioneer aviator Norman Brearley; and businessmen James Cruthers; and Lance Brisbane. Speech pathologist Lionel Logue taught at the school from 1910 to 1911. Olympian Shirley Strickland taught mathematics and physics to returned servicemen in her spare time at the school in the period after World War II. Olympic swimmer Neil Brooks studied accountancy at the Leederville campus in 1978. The sculptor Tony Jones taught there until 2015.
