= Central Gippsland Institute of TAFE =

Australian education institution

Federation Training
- Previously Advance TAFE & GippsTAFE
- Type: TAFE Institute
- Established: 1928
- Students: 12,000
- Location: Victoria, Australia
- Campus: Bairnsdale, Seamec, Forestec, Lakes Entrance, Leongatha, Morwell, Sale, Traralgon, Warragul, Yallourn
- CEO: Grant Radford
- Website: www.federationtraining.edu.au

== Federation Training ==
Established 1 May 2014 following the amalgamation of Advance TAFE and GippsTAFE, with 10 campuses from Warragul in West Gippsland across the state to Lakes Entrance in the east.

== GippsTAFE Academy ==
In 2012, GippsTAFE opened its doors to the GippsTAFE Academy, located in the heart of Traralgon. The Academy introduces higher education programs, including graduate certificates and graduate diplomas. Pathway options to University will also be a focus for the Academy.

GippsTAFE also offers a range of other services including:The GETT Centre, which provides training and employment opportunities for individuals who suffer from disability or illness.

== Gippsland Educational Precinct ==
In 2004 Central Gippsland Institute of TAFE (GippsTAFE) signed a partnership agreement to develop the Gippsland Education Precinct (GEP) at Churchill together with Monash University, Gippsland Group Training, Kurnai Secondary College and Latrobe City, to provide wider vocational options and lift the region's high school retention rate. The Gippsland Education Precinct elected for voluntary cancellation of its Incorporation in 2014, with available residual funds transferred to the Federation University Australia Foundation. Bursaries were establish intending to assist students to continue their education and career development.
