= South Metropolitan TAFE =

Educational institution in Western Australia

- Former names: Challenger Institute of Technology; Challenger TAFE; South Metropolitan College of TAFE; South Metropolitan Technical College; Polytechnic West
- Type: Technical and further education
- Established: 1898
- Chair: Elizabeth Carr
- Location: Fremantle, W.A., Australia
- Campus: Fremantle, Bentley, Jandakot, Murdoch, Kwinana, Munster, Rockingham, Thornlie, Mandurah.
- Website: www.southmetrotafe.wa.edu.au

The South Metropolitan TAFE (formerly known as the Challenger Institute of Technology or Challenger TAFE) is a Technical and Further Education (TAFE) institution with campuses in Armadale, Bentley, Carlisle, Fremantle, Jandakot, Kwinana, Mandurah, Munster, Murdoch, Naval Base, Rockingham and Thornlie in Western Australia.

On 11 April 2016, Challenger Institute of Technology was merged with Polytechnic West, and became South Metropolitan TAFE. It is a registered training organisation (RTO Code: 52787) containing more than 350 courses over various industry training areas for full-time, part-time, workplace based and online study, as well as customised training, apprenticeships and traineeships. Each year, over 25,000 students from urban and rural areas attend South Metropolitan TAFE. The TAFE is also attended by many international students at offshore training facilities and programs in Mauritius, Qatar, United Arab Emirates, India, China, Singapore, Sri Lanka and Indonesia.

South Metropolitan TAFE won the Australian Defence Industry Awards 2022 Academic Institution of the Year award, and the WA Training Awards Large Training Provider of the Year 2022.

== Courses ==
South Metropolitan TAFE award courses adhere to the Australian Quality Training Framework (AQTF), which establishes standard titles and levels for courses across Australia. Qualifications offered at South Metropolitan TAFE range from Certificate 1 level through to Advanced Diploma, as well as short courses, skill sets and customised training for business. The TAFE also has university pathway arrangements through Curtin University and Murdoch University.

== Campuses and Access Centres ==
South Metropolitan TAFE has campuses in Armadale, Bentley, Carlisle, Fremantle, Murdoch, Jandakot, Kwinana, Naval Base, Munster, Thornlie, Rockingham and Mandurah.

As well as its south metropolitan campuses, additional Access Centres are located in the regional towns of Pinjarra, Boddington, Waroona and Mundijong.
