= Advance TAFE =

Educational institute in Victoria, Australia

Coordinates: 37°49′30″S 147°38′7″E

TAFE Gippsland
- Type: TAFE Institute
- Established: 1986 with antecedents to 1886
- Students: 11,000 (2006)
- Location: Bairnsdale, Victoria, Australia
- Campus: Bairnsdale, Lakes Entrance, Sale,
- CEO: Grant Radford
- Website: http://www.tafegippsland.edu.au/

TAFE Gippsland, formerly Advance TAFE & East Gippsland Institute of TAFE, is a TAFE institute located in the Gippsland region of Victoria, Australia. It has campuses located at Bairnsdale, Lakes Entrance and Sale as well as specialist education centres located across the south-east of Victoria, encompassing the Wellington Shire and East Gippsland Shire regions.

A wide selection of study options in vocational education are offered from short courses, pre-apprenticeships, apprenticeships and traineeships through to certificate, diploma and advanced diploma levels under the Australian Qualifications Framework. In 2006 11,000 students studied at Advance TAFE at over 350 courses.

The institute developed relationships with a number of universities and other training providers (including RMIT University, Monash University, Deakin University, University of Ballarat, Central Gippsland Institute of TAFE, and Canberra Institute of Technology).

== History ==
East Gippsland TAFE had its origins in early technical and vocational education during the late nineteenth century in the Bairnsdale School of Mines and the Sale and Bairnsdale Technical Schools.

East Gippsland TAFE signed an affiliation agreement with RMIT University on 4 February 2003. In November 2011 East Gippsland TAFE changed their name to Advance TAFE.

Effective from 1 May 2014, Advance TAFE and the Central Gippsland Institute of TAFE were amalgamated and renamed 'Federation Training' pursuant to an order by the Governor in Council, State of Victoria, made under the Education and Training Reform Act 2006 (Vic).

== Campuses ==
TAFE Gippsland has three main campuses at Bairnsdale, Sale and Lakes Entrance, as well as a number of smaller specialist education centres.

Bairnsdale

- Bairnsdale Campus with G-tec is the largest campus and is located at 48 Main Street. It also incorporates G-tec, a specially designed adult learning environment for Year 11 and 12 students who wish to start a school-based apprenticeship or traineeship while completing their VCE/VCAL studies.
- Bairnsdale Trade Centre specialise in trades and industry training and is located at 96 Victoria Street.
- Oaktree Restaurant is also situated at the 48 Main Street location and is an Advance TAFE training restaurant.
- The Riverside Hub is a convention centre that can accommodate from 20 to 150 people with video conference facilities.

Sale

- Fulham Campus is the major Sale campus and is located on the Princes Highway.
- Work Safety Centre is also located at the Fulham campus and offers a wide range of work safety courses that provide the training and assessment to ensure employees and contractors are properly licensed.
- Farmtec is located at Aerodrome Road and specialise in agriculture, horticulture and primary industry training.
- G-tec is located at 37 Cobain's Road and is a specially designed adult learning environment for Year 11 and 12 students who wish to start a school-based apprenticeship or traineeship while completing their VCE/VCAL studies.
- Flexible Learning Centre is located on the corner of Desailly Street and Cunninghame Street and specialise in flexible or 'distance' learning.

Lakes Entrance

- Seamec is located at Bullock Island and provides specialist training in maritime, aquaculture and recreational boating.
- Forestec provides specialist training in timber industry skills.

== Institute Awards ==
2006 Victorian Training Provider of the Year (Large) Award

2008 Gold Star rating for Australian Training Excellence

2008 Wurreker Award

2009 Victorian Teacher/Trainer of the Year

2010 Gippsland Best Training Provider
