= Warrnambool Institute of Advanced Education =

Warrnambool Institute of Advanced Education (WIAE) was a college of advanced education in Warrnambool, Victoria, Australia.

It was created in July 1969 after the tertiary section of Warrnambool Technical College (now South West TAFE) was affiliated with the Victorian Institute of Colleges (VIC), under the name of the Warrnambool Institute of Advanced Education, after Warrnambool residents had been lobbying for provision of tertiary education in the region. 170 students enrolled in 1970. It was the first provider of tertiary education in Warrnambool.

The college completed a move from its premises on Timor Street to its current location on Princes Highway near Sherwood Park railway station in 1984, and by 1988 enrolments had grown to 3000 by 1988. The college offered undergraduate and postgraduate course in aquaculture, humanities, commerce, municipal engineering, and applied science, as well as nursing education and teacher training.

The Deakin University (Warrnambool) Act 1990 (No. 28 of 1990) merged the institute with Deakin University, becoming its Warrnambool campus.

In October 2019 WIAE celebrated its 50th anniversary.
