= OTEN =

Australian open education service

The Open Training and Education Network, often abbreviated OTEN, is an Open education service offered by TAFE NSW. It was rebranded as TAFE Digital during the OneTAFE restructure at the beginning of 2018. Students may enrol from anywhere in Australia, while operationally the program is run by the Western Sydney Institute of TAFE. OTEN courses are delivered using a range of media, including printed materials, videos, CD-ROMs and DVDs. Some OTEN courses and units are delivered online. OTEN students may also access local TAFE NSW library facilities.

OTEN is a member of the Australian Open Universities scheme.

== History ==
The first use of distance education for Australian VET was in 1910 when Sydney Technical College launched an emergency correspondence course to train health inspectors at a time when the country was gripped by a typhoid epidemic. By 1917, what had become the Correspondence Division was offering more than 20 subjects to distance learners, using a mix of correspondence education and converted railway wagons acting as makeshift classrooms and workshops. It also later assisted Australia's Second World War efforts by training 100,000 Australian and 43,000 US service personnel. In 1978, the service became known as the College of External Studies; in 1991, it was renamed the TAFE NSW Open Training and Education Network, or OTEN as it is now better known.

In 1995, OTEN was relocated to a purpose-built facility in Strathfield, 14 kilometres west of the Sydney central business district. Since that time, it has grown exponentially. In 1998, it became a Registered Training Organisation (RTO). In 2000, it introduced a custom-designed Student Administration System (SAM), an integrated online student records, educational resource and materials supply chain management system. In 2002, it created an online tracking system to monitor students’ progress. In 2010, it celebrated 100 years of public distance education in NSW.

== OTEN’s Online Learning Systems ==
The rapid growth of the Internet coupled with the massive influence of social media has enabled OTEN to transition from what was essentially a correspondence school to an institution that offers online multimedia and interactive support for prospective and current students using such technologies as Moodle, Equella and Adobe Connect. This has enabled OTEN to increase its enrolments from 35,813 in 2006 to 118,060 in 2014.

In 2012, OTEN redeveloped its website to incorporate features such as online chat and an interactive world map showing how many people are accessing the online learning system. Its delivery of real-time experiences for students has resulted in even more students accessing the site, sharing resources, discussing content and supporting one another in their educational journeys. OTEN also uses virtual classroom and conference tools to conduct live orientation sessions and tutorials for students.

The Student Administration and Management System (SAM) enables OTEN to efficiently manage its distance students and on-campus and offsite teachers. It provides a comprehensive, auditable event and contact history for every student and manages the dispatch of well over 300,000 learning resource items per year.

Another OTEN custom-designed online tool is Your Decision, which helps prospective students assess whether distance learning is suited to their needs and circumstances. This interactive platform features videos, course tasters and self-reflection tools and enables people to sample short courses in the form of Massive Open Online Courses (MOOCs).

== Sources ==
This article incorporates text from a free content work. Licensed under CC-BY-SA IGO 3.0 (license statement/permission). Text taken from Using ICTs and Blended Learning in Transforming TVET, 85, UNESCO, UNESCO. UNESCO.
