= South Regional TAFE =

Western Australian vocational education institution

- Type: Vocational Education and Training
- Established: 2016
- Location: Western Australia, Australia
- Website: www.southregionaltafe.wa.edu.au

South Regional TAFE is a State Training Provider providing a range of vocational education located in southern regional Western Australia. On 11 April 2016, South West Institute of Technology, Great Southern Institute of Technology, the CY O’Connor Institute Narrogin campus and the Goldfields Institute of Technology Esperance campus formed South Regional TAFE.

== Campuses and facilities ==
The college currently trains around 6,000 students each year and operates at 12 campuses in southern Western Australia:

- Albany
- Bunbury
- Busselton
- Collie
- Denmark
- Esperance
- Harvey
- Katanning
- Margaret River
- Manjimup
- Mount Barker
- Narrogin

== Courses ==
South Regional TAFE offer courses in areas including:

- Adult Learning & Bridging Courses
- Agriculture & Environment
- Arts & Design
- Automotive & Engineering
- Building & Construction Trades
- Business & Administration
- Design & Drafting
- Hair & Beauty
- Health & Community Services
- Hospitality & Tourism
- Information Technology
- Mining, Resources and Science
- Retail
- Sports & Recreation
- Surveying
- Training & Education
- Work Health, Safety and Cleaning

South Regional TAFE courses are in line with the Australian Qualifications Framework (AQF). The AQF establishes standard titles and levels for courses across Australia. The qualifications currently offered include:

- Advanced Diploma
- Diploma
- Certificate IV
- Certificate III
- Certificate II
- Certificate I
