= Polytechnic West =

Former educational institution in Western Austfalia

- Former names: Swan TAFE, South East Metropolitan College of TAFE (SEMC), Midland College of TAFE, Perth Technical School
- Type: Vocational education and training
- Location: Perth, Western Australia, Australia
- Website: www.polytechnic.wa.edu.au

Polytechnic West (formerly Swan TAFE) was a State Training Provider established under section 35 of the Vocational Education and Training Act 1996 (WA) based in Perth, Western Australia. Polytechnic West is one of the largest training providers in the state and teaches and instructs in a range of areas from trade-based apprenticeships to business and finance to aviation across its eight campuses in Bentley, Carlisle, Midland, Thornlie, Balga, Jandakot and two Armadale campuses.

Polytechnic West had existed under various guises since the early 20th century, when Perth Technical School was established to train professional and skilled workers for the new railway technologies that supported the state's agriculture and mining industries. The most recent change was from Swan TAFE in 2009 as part of a government initiative in which State Training Providers were granted more independence and encouraged to "reinvent themselves to meet the requirements of the volatile economic climate". Polytechnic West's reinvention saw it branch out into areas normally untouched by State Training Providers (STP), and was the first STP to teach Higher Education.

Polytechnic West was Western Australia's Large Training Provider of the Year in 2011.

In April 2016, the Government of Western Australia announced the reform of the TAFEs. Polytechnic West was merged with the Challenger Institute, to become the South Metropolitan TAFE. Starting from 2017, the campuses in Midland and Balga were transferred to the North Metropolitan TAFE.

== Courses ==
Polytechnic West offered over 400 courses in areas including:

- Access, English & Languages
- Aerospace
- Animals & Horticulture
- Automotive
- Building, Construction & Furniture
- Business & Finance
- Community, Children & Education
- Creative & Design
- Electrical, Electronics & Telecommunications
- Engineering, Metals & Mining
- Hospitality & Food Trades
- Occupational Health & Fitness
- Information Technology
- Refrigeration, Plumbing & Gas

Polytechnic West award courses were in line with the Australian Quality Training Framework (AQTF). The AQTF establishes standard titles and levels for courses across Australia. The qualifications that were offered included:

- Associate Degree
- Advanced Diploma
- Diploma
- Certificate IV
- Certificate III
- Certificate II
- Certificate I

== Campuses and facilities ==
Polytechnic West had 8 campuses. They were:

- Armadale
- Armadale Equine Training Centre
- Balga
- Bentley
- Carlisle
- Jandakot
- Midland
- Thornlie
