= South West Institute of TAFE =

Regional technical training provider in South West Victoria, Australia

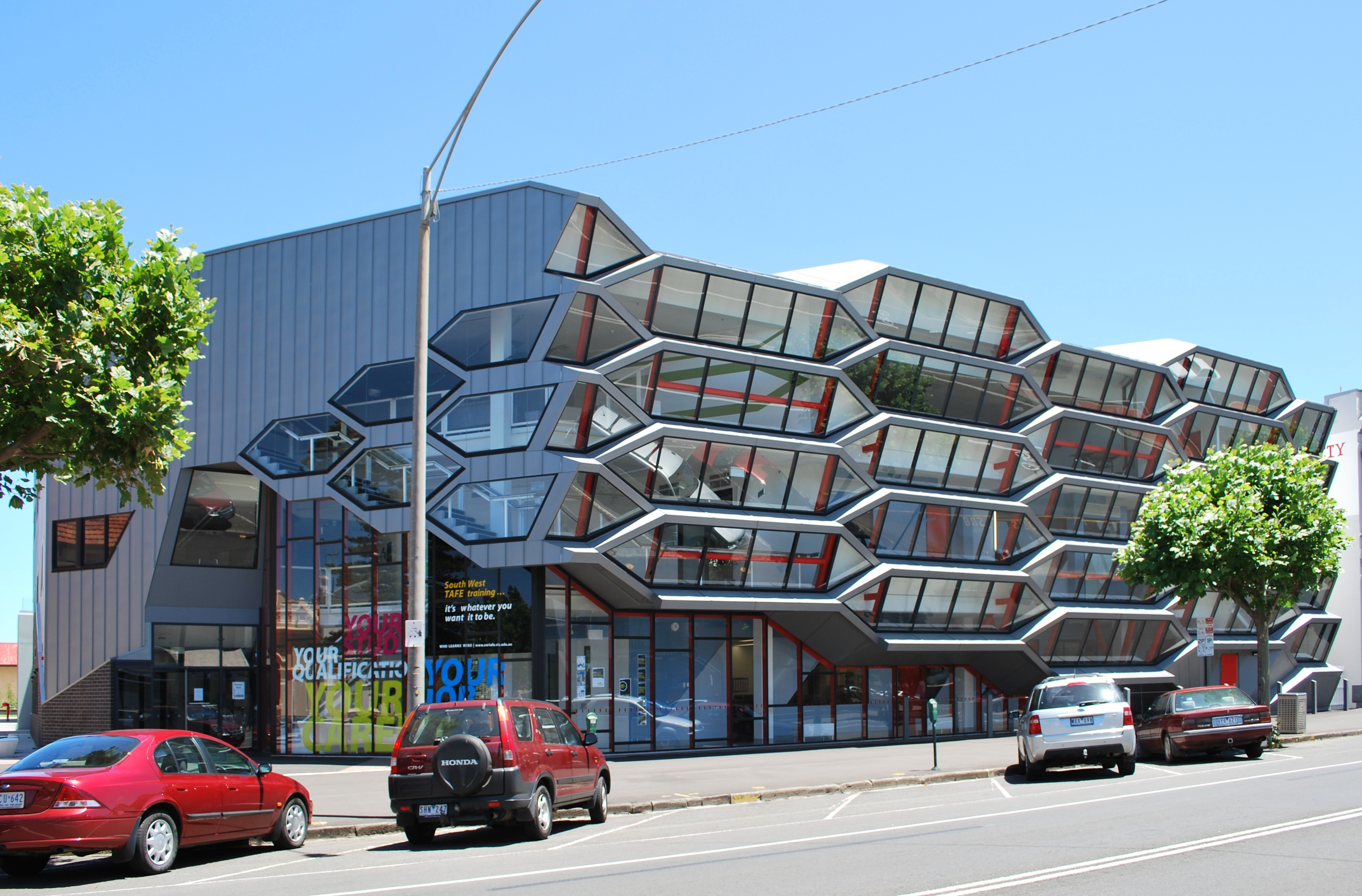
Warrnambool campus

South West Institute of TAFE is the Technical and Further Education (TAFE) Institute located in the south west of the Australian state of Victoria.

South West TAFE’s campuses are located in Warrnambool, Hamilton, Portland and Colac, with training facilities also located at Glenormiston and Sherwood Park (Deakin Warrnambool).

== History ==
Technical education in Warrnambool had its roots in a Mechanics Institute, established in 1853. A technical school operated from the Mechanics Institute until larger premises were sought from 1908. Warrnambool Technical School operated on the current campus from 1913, operating within the state education system. It became known as the Warrnambool Technical College in 1958, The tertiary component of the College became the Warrnambool Institute of Advanced Education (WIAE), and when the TAFE section separated from the WIAE in 1984, there was another name change to Warrnambool College of Technical and Further Education (TAFE).

South West Institute of TAFE came into existence as a multi-campus institution on 9 January 1987, when the TAFE operations of the Hamilton and Portland Technical Schools were combined with the Warrnambool College of TAFE. Known firstly as the South West College of TAFE, the college was renamed on 1 August 1995 to become the South West Institute of TAFE.

From 2006 until 2013, the Institute managed Glenormiston College and assumed further regional responsibilities for training in agriculture, and farm and horse management. The Glenormiston campus was shut down due to government education funding cuts in 2013.

== Buildings ==
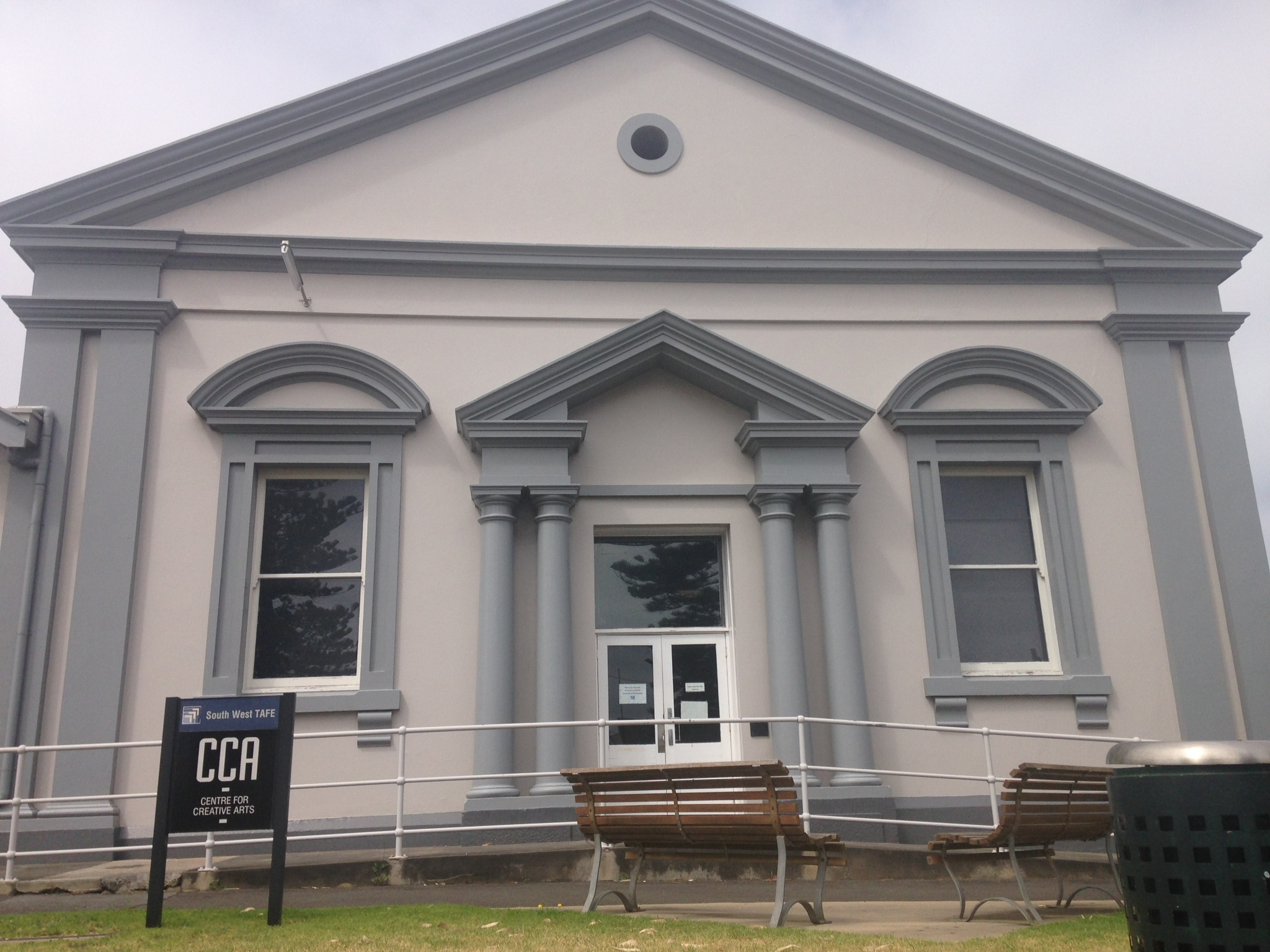
Centre for Creative Arts building

The Warrnambool campus includes the heritage building on Kepler Street, built as the Orderly Room for the Warrnambool Detachment, Western Corps Royal Victorian Volunteer Artillery. It opened on 31 December 1868. The Warrnambool Technical College took over the building on 10 February 1960. It was used as the College Library, and by the art department from 2013.
