= Goulburn Ovens Institute of TAFE =

Education provider in Victoria, Australia

GOTAFE
- Type: TAFE Institute
- Established: 1996
- Administrative staff: 400+ (2007)
- Students: 9000
- Location: Shepparton, Victoria, Australia
- Campus: Benalla, Seymour, Shepparton, Wangaratta, Wallan
- CEO: Phil Paterson
- Website: http://www.gotafe.vic.edu.au

Goulburn Ovens Institute of TAFE, also known as GOTAFE, is the largest vocational education provider in regional Victoria. Offering over 130 courses across eight campuses, GOTAFE services 11 local government areas with an estimated resident population of over 240,000 people.

== Campuses ==
The Institute has number of campuses in towns including Shepparton, Wangaratta, Seymour, Benalla, Wallan and have most recently added a Mobile Campus.

=== Benalla ===
In 2004 Lynne Kosky, the then Minister for Education, opened the Benalla Performing Arts and Convention Centre at the Goulburn Ovens Institute of TAFE. Kosky said "This campus will facilitate the delivery of approximately 226,000 student contact hours to more than 1100 students each year," The $4.2 million campus upgrade was funded jointly by the State Government, Benalla Rural City Council and the Goulburn Ovens Institute of TAFE.

=== Shepparton ===
There are three campuses in Shepparton. The Fryers Street Campus houses the Institute's Administration and a large number of teaching Departments such as Business and IT, Beauty, Community Services, Education, Nursing and Hospitality. Archer Street Campus which houses Building & Construction, Furniture Making, Art & Design, Carpentry, Joinery, and associated Construction Trades. On the outskirts of Shepparton is the William Orr campus: a 120 hectare property which has a diverse range of classes being offered in areas of Agriculture, Horticulture, Plumbing, Automotive, Dairy Farming and recently Cyber Security. The campus also has Plumbing and Automotive Workshops and Horticultural facilities including a large greenhouse. An upgrade is currently underway across Agriculture, Horticulture, Automotive and Plumbing.

=== Seymour ===
The Seymour campus was opened in 1998 and offers a variety of courses including Nursing and Trades.

=== Wangaratta ===
There are two campuses in Wangaratta. The Docker street campus in Wangaratta offers a range of specialist training facilities, library, café and support services, and courses in the areas of as Art & Design, Automotive, Beauty, Community Services, Engineering, Education, Nursing, Plumbing, Building and Construction. The Tone Rd campus on the outskirts of Wangaratta is the home for the Equine, Animal Sciences, Agriculture, Horticulture and Viticulture Departments and most recently Business and Information Technology. This campus is referred to as the Wangaratta Regional Study Centre Campus, a facility catering to the needs of the Animal Science, Equine, Agriculture, Horticulture and Viticulture industries. The Centre provides a range of facilities including lecture theatres and tutorial rooms, interactive video teaching and information technology facilities, a science laboratory and a student learning commons. Computer labs accommodate both Charles Sturt University (CSU) and GOTAFE students.

== History ==
In October 1996 the Goulburn Valley Institute of TAFE and the Wangaratta Institute of TAFE were combined to form the Goulburn Ovens Institute of TAFE, later known as "GOTAFE".

The Institute's antecedents go back to the Wangaratta Technical School (1928) and Shepparton Technical College (1953).

In 1972 the Wangaratta Technical School became the Wangaratta Technical College, followed by Wangaratta College of TAFE in 1981, and Wangaratta Institute of TAFE in 1995.

The Shepparton Technical College became the Shepparton College of TAFE in 1981, then the Goulburn Valley College of TAFE in 1986, Goulburn Valley Community College in 1992, and Goulburn Valley Institute of TAFE in 1995.

Dookie College (1886) was for a time a joint campus of the TAFE and the University of Melbourne.
