= Education in Australia =

Australian Government
- Minister for Education: Jason Clare

National education budget (2024–25)
- Budget: A$53 billion 7.2% of federal budget

General details
- Primary languages: English
- System type: State
- Established compulsory education: 1830s 1870s

Literacy (2003)
- Total: 99%
- Male: 99%
- Female: 99%

Enrollment (2021)
- Total: 20.4% of population
- Primary: 2.0 million
- Secondary: 1.6 million
- Post secondary: 1.1 million

Attainment (2023)
- Secondary diploma: 79.1%

Education in Australia encompasses the sectors of early childhood education (preschool and pre-primary) and primary education (primary schools), followed by secondary education (high schools and senior high schools), and finally tertiary education, which includes higher education (universities and other higher education providers) and vocational education (registered training organisations). Regulation and funding of education is primarily the responsibility of the States and territories; however, the Australian Government also contributes to funding.

Education in Australia is compulsory between the ages of four, five, or six and fifteen, sixteen or seventeen, depending on the state or territory and the date of birth.

== Timeline of introduction of compulsory education ==
- 1871: Western Australia
- 1872: Victoria
- 1875: South Australia
- 1880: New South Wales
- 1900: Queensland
- 1916: Tasmania

For primary and secondary education, government schools educate approximately 64 per cent of Australian students, with approximately 36 per cent in non-government schools. At the tertiary level, the majority of Australia's universities are public, and student fees are subsidised through a student loan program where payment becomes due when debtors reach a certain income level, known as HECS. Underpinned by the Australian Qualifications Framework, implemented in 1995, Australia has adopted a national system of qualifications, encompassing higher education, vocational education and training (VET), and school-based education. For primary and secondary schools, a national Australian Curriculum has been progressively developed and implemented since 2010.

In 2012 Australia was ranked as the third-largest provider of international education after the United States and the United Kingdom.

In the 2022 PISA study by the OECD Australian students placed 18th in the world in reading, 25th in maths and 21st in science.

However, the Education Index, published with the UN's Human Development Index in 2018, based on data from 2017, listed Australia as 0.929, the second-highest in the world.

== Regulation, operation, and funding ==
The regulation, operation, and funding of education is the responsibility of the states and territories, because the Australian Government does not have a specific constitutional power to pass laws with concerning education. However, the federal government helps to fund non-government schools, helps to fund public universities, and subsidises tertiary education through a national student loan scheme, and regulates vocational education providers.

Post-compulsory education is regulated within the Australian Qualifications Framework, a unified system of national qualifications in schools, vocational education and training, and the tertiary education sector.

The Australian Government's involvement in education has been the responsibility of several departments over the years,^{[note a]} with the Department of Education, Skills and Employment being formed in 2020.

The academic year in Australia varies among states and institutions; however, it generally runs from late January/early February until early/mid-December for primary and secondary schools and TAFE colleges, with slight variations in the inter-term holidays, and from late February until mid-November for universities, with seasonal holidays and breaks for each educational institute.

Research published during February 2026 found that high school in Australia costs almost four times more than the OECD average, making it the most expensive developed country in the world in terms of average annual high school tuition.

== Preschool ==
Government provision in Australia during the years before children start school is a relatively recent innovation. Historically, preschool and pre-prep programs in Australia were relatively unregulated, and children were cared for in informal ways by baby-sitters and by members of their families and close associates. While still not mandatory for children to attend, the Federal Government has had a focus since 2009 on encouraging families to enroll their children (from around 4 years of age) in a preschool or kindergarten that delivers quality early childhood education and care. Federal and state legislation requires preschool services to implement and deliver programming based on the nationally approved Early Years Learning Framework, implemented from 2009. The first exposure many Australian children have to learn with others outside of traditional parenting is daycare or a parent-run playgroup. This sort of activity is not generally considered schooling, as preschool education is separate from primary school in all states and territories except Western Australia—where pre-school education is taught as part of the primary school system—and Victoria, where the state framework, the Victorian Early Years Learning and Development Framework (VEYLDF) covers children from birth to eight years old, is used by some schools over the national framework. In Queensland, preschool programs are often called Kindergarten or Pre-Prep and are usually privately run but attract state government funding if run for at least 600 hours a year and delivered by a registered teacher.

Preschools are usually run by the state and territory governments, except in Victoria, South Australia and New South Wales where they are more often run by local councils, community groups or private organisations. Preschool is offered for children ages three to five; attendance numbers vary widely between the states, but 85.7% of children attended preschool the year before school, the main year of preschool attendance. This year is far more commonly attended and may take the form of a few hours of activity during weekdays. Most states of Australia now fund government preschools to offer 15 hours per week (600 hours over a year) for each enrolled child in the year before they commence formal schooling

== Primary and secondary education ==
People attending a primary school as a percentage of the local population at the 2011 census, geographically subdivided by statistical local area

People attending secondary school as a percentage of the local population at the 2011 census, geographically subdivided by statistical local area

As of 2025, 4,160,918 students were enrolled in 9,673 primary, secondary and special schools in Australia. As of 2025, government schools educated 62.8% of all students, while Catholic schools (20%) and independent schools (17.2%) educated the rest. As of 2025, there were just under 325,190 full-time equivalent (FTE) teaching staff in Australian primary and secondary schools. The major part of government-run schools' costs is met by the relevant state or territory government. The Australian Government provides the majority of public funding for non-government schools, which is supplemented by states and territories.

Non-government schools, both religious or secular typically charge compulsory tuition and other fees. Government schools provide education without compulsory tuition fees, although many government schools ask for payment of 'voluntary' fees to defray particular expenses.

Regardless of whether a school is government or non-government, it is regulated by the same curriculum standards framework. The framework is administered by the Australian Curriculum, Assessment and Reporting Authority. Most schools require students to wear prescribed school uniforms. A school year in Australia typically starts in January/February and finishes in December.

=== Compulsory attendance requirements ===
School education in Australia is compulsory between certain ages as specified by state or territory legislation. Depending on the state or territory, and date of birth of the child, school is compulsory from the age of five to six to the age of fifteen to seventeen.

In the ACT, NSW, the Northern Territory, Queensland, South Australia, Victoria, and Western Australia, children are legally required to attend school from the age of six years old, until the minimum leaving age. In Tasmania, the compulsory school starting age is 5 years old. However, most children commence the preliminary year of formal schooling, in Pre-Year 1, between four and a half and five and a half years of age, variously called kindergarten (sometimes called Year K), reception, preparation (also abbreviated as "prep"), transition, or foundation.

As of 2025, the national year 10 to year 12 apparent retention rate (ARR), a measure of student engagement that provides an indicator of the success of education systems in keeping students in school beyond the minimum leaving age, was 81.3 per cent for all full-time students in Year 12.

=== Australian Curriculum ===
While state and territory governments are responsible for the regulation and delivery of school-based education within their jurisdiction, through the Council of Australian Governments, the Commonwealth Government has, since 2014, played an increasing role in the establishment of the Australian Curriculum that sets the expectations for what all young Australians should be taught, regardless of where they live in Australia or their background. The development of the Australian Curriculum is based on the principles of improving the quality, equity and transparency of Australia's education system. The Australian Curriculum, for pre-Year 1 to Year 9, is made up of English, maths, science, social studies, arts, technology, health education and foreign languages. In the senior secondary Australian Curriculum, for Year 10, Year 11 and Year 12, fifteen senior secondary subjects across English, maths, science, history and geography were endorsed between 2012 and 2013. The Australian Curriculum, Assessment and Reporting Authority has mandated the achievement standards that describe the quality of learning (including the depth of understanding, the extent of knowledge, and the sophistication of skill) expected of students who have studied the content for each subject.

=== Types of schools ===
The types of schools in Australia fall broadly into two categories: government schools, being those schools operated by state or territory departments or agencies; and non-government schools, being those schools that are not operated by government departments or agencies. Non-government schools can be further classified, based on self-identification of the school's affiliation. Non-government schools are grouped for reporting as Catholic schools (including Catholic-affiliated private schools) or private (other non-government schools).

Government schools receive funding from the relevant state or territory government. Non-government schools receive funding from the Australian Government and relevant state or territory government; and in most cases, parents are required to make a co-payment for their child's education.

As of 2019 across primary and secondary education, approximately two-thirds of all school students attended government schools; with the remaining one-third of students educated in non-government schools.

A small portion of students are legally home-schooled, particularly in rural areas. Part of these students supplement their education with the School of the Air, an Australian government education programme to provide access to primary and secondary education for children in remote areas. Beginning in 1951 this programme initially operated through radio broadcasts, however telephone classes teaching replaced these broadcasts in 2005. From 2007 to 2009, online classes and resources were rolled out and became the primary method of learning.

=== Scholar performance ===
According to the 2022 PISA evaluations, Australian 15-year-olds ranked ninth in the OECD for reading and science and tenth for maths. However, less than 60% of Australian students achieved the National Proficiency Standard – 51% in maths, 58% in science and 57% in reading.

== School years ==
=== Primary schools ===
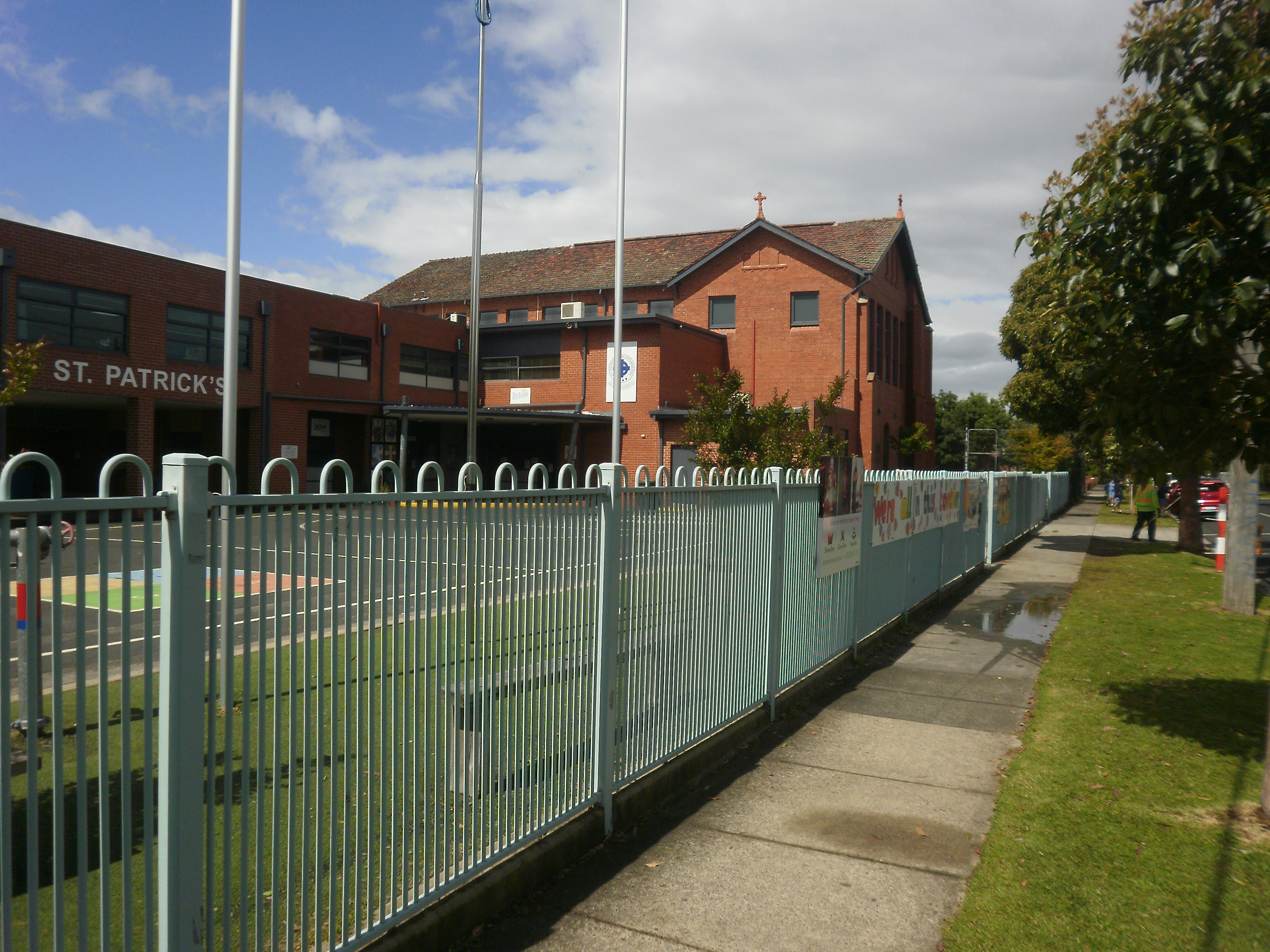
St Patricks Primary in Murrumbeena is one of many Catholic primary schools in Australia

Also sometimes called infants schools, Australia adopts the UNESCO term of primary school that generally covers a child's education from pre–Year 1 and finishes with Year 6. The duration of primary school years varies across each Australian state and territory, with most adopting seven years- except in South Australia, where, until 2022, students finished with Year 7, making the duration of primary school eight years- until they are 11, 12 or 13 years of age. Primary schools focus on developing essential literacy, numeracy and social skills, and provide foundational knowledge to children about the world around them.

=== Secondary schools ===
Secondary schools in Australia are also called high schools^{[note b]} and colleges (or junior, intermediate, or senior colleges). Secondary schools vary across each Australian state and territory, but they generally cover Year 7 to Year 9 (compulsory period of education) and senior secondary schools continue to Year 12. Progressively, as students move from primary into secondary schools, subject matter becomes increasingly specialised, offering opportunities to students that show preferences in STEM, or in Humanities and Social Sciences, among other interests.

=== Middle schools ===
In the majority of Australian states and territories, middle schools are relatively uncommon. Students progress from primary school to secondary school. As an alternative to the middle school model, some secondary schools divided their grades into "junior high school" (Years 7, 8 and 9) and "senior high school" (Years 10, 11 and 12). Some have three levels, "junior" (Years 7 and 8), "intermediate" (Years 9 and 10), and "senior" (Years 11 and 12).

In June 2006 the Northern Territory Government introduced a three-tier system featuring middle schools for Year 7 to Year 9 (approximate age 12–15) and high school for Year 10 to Year 12 (approximate age 15–18).

=== Combined and central schools ===
In Australia, combined schools, also known as K-12 schools, are schools that have classes from both primary and secondary year levels. These schools may be located in an urban, regional or rural area and can be government or non-government schools. As of 2019 there were approximately 500 Australian combined government schools and approximately 850 Australian combined non-government schools.

In Western Australia, the term district high school is used to describe a school that educates students from pre-prep to year 10.

In New South Wales, Central schools are predominantly, government schools located in a rural area that provides both primary and lower secondary education to students, usually concluding at Year 10. These provide secondary education to students from multiple primary schools, in rural areas with too low of a population to support a secondary school. As of 2024 there were 58 central schools.

== Organisational structures ==
Schools are broadly categorised into government and non-government schools. The non-government schools are further categorised into Catholic schools and private schools. As of 2018, 65.7% of students were enrolled in government schools, 19.7% in catholic schools and 14.6% in private schools.

Student enrolments by school affiliation, Australia, 2014–2025
Year	Government	Non-government		Total
Year	Government	Catholic	Private	Total
2014	2,406,495	765,539	529,857	3,694,101
2015	2,445,130	757,749	540,304	3,750,973
2016	2,483,802	767,050	547,374	3,798,226
2017	2,524,865	766,870	557,490	3,849,225
2018	2,558,169	765,735	569,930	3,893,834
2019	2,594,830	769,719	584,262	3,948,811
2020	2,629,143	778,605	599,226	4,006,974
2021	2,622,755	787,181	620,781	4,030,717
2022	2,605,826	795,368	641,318	4,042,512
2023	2,614,094	806,323	666,581	4,086,998
2024	2,619,513	820,222	692,271	4,132,006
2025	2,613,404	831,692	715,822	4,160,918

=== Government schools ===
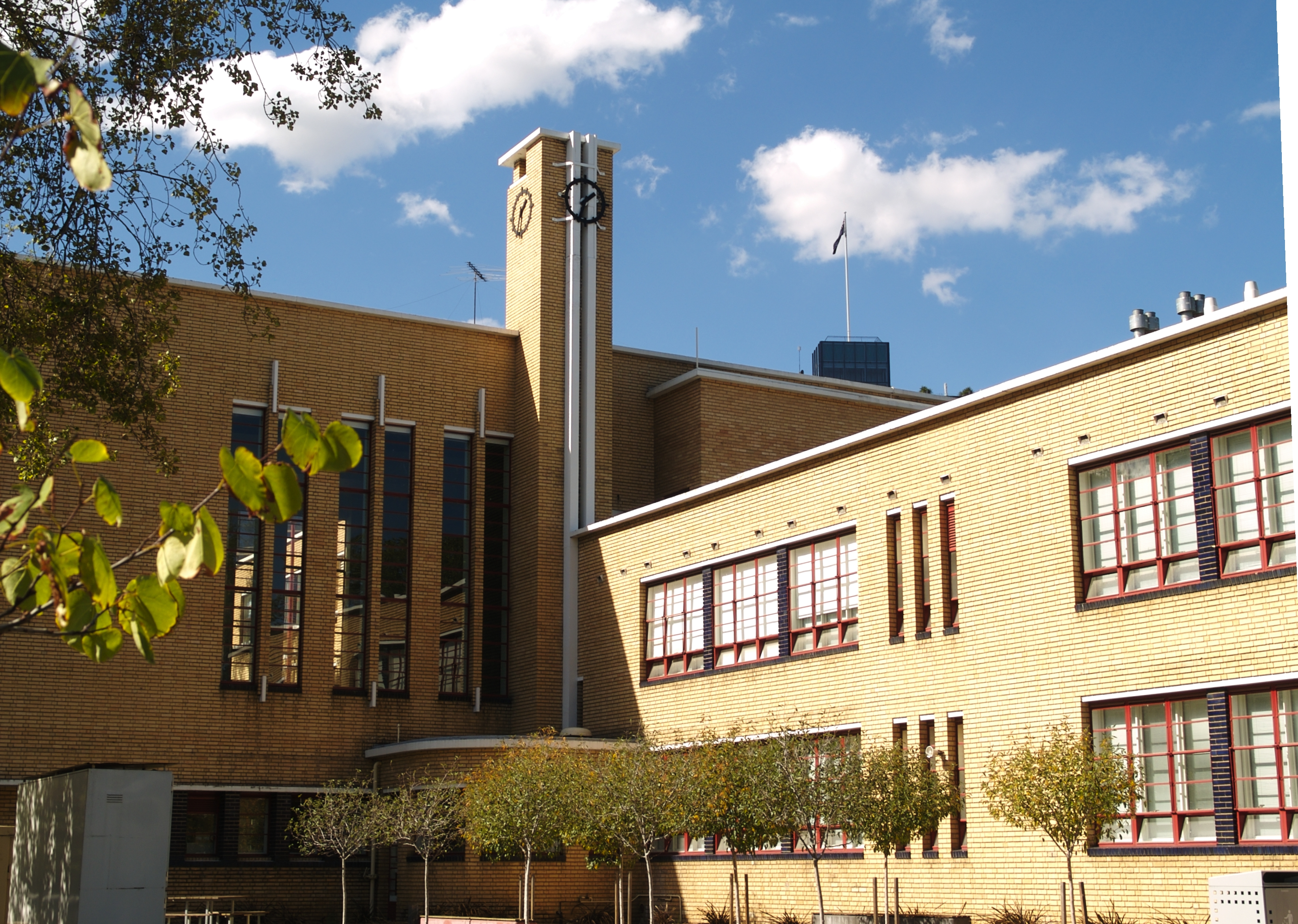
The Mac.Robertson Girls' High School, a government school in Melbourne CBD, 2007

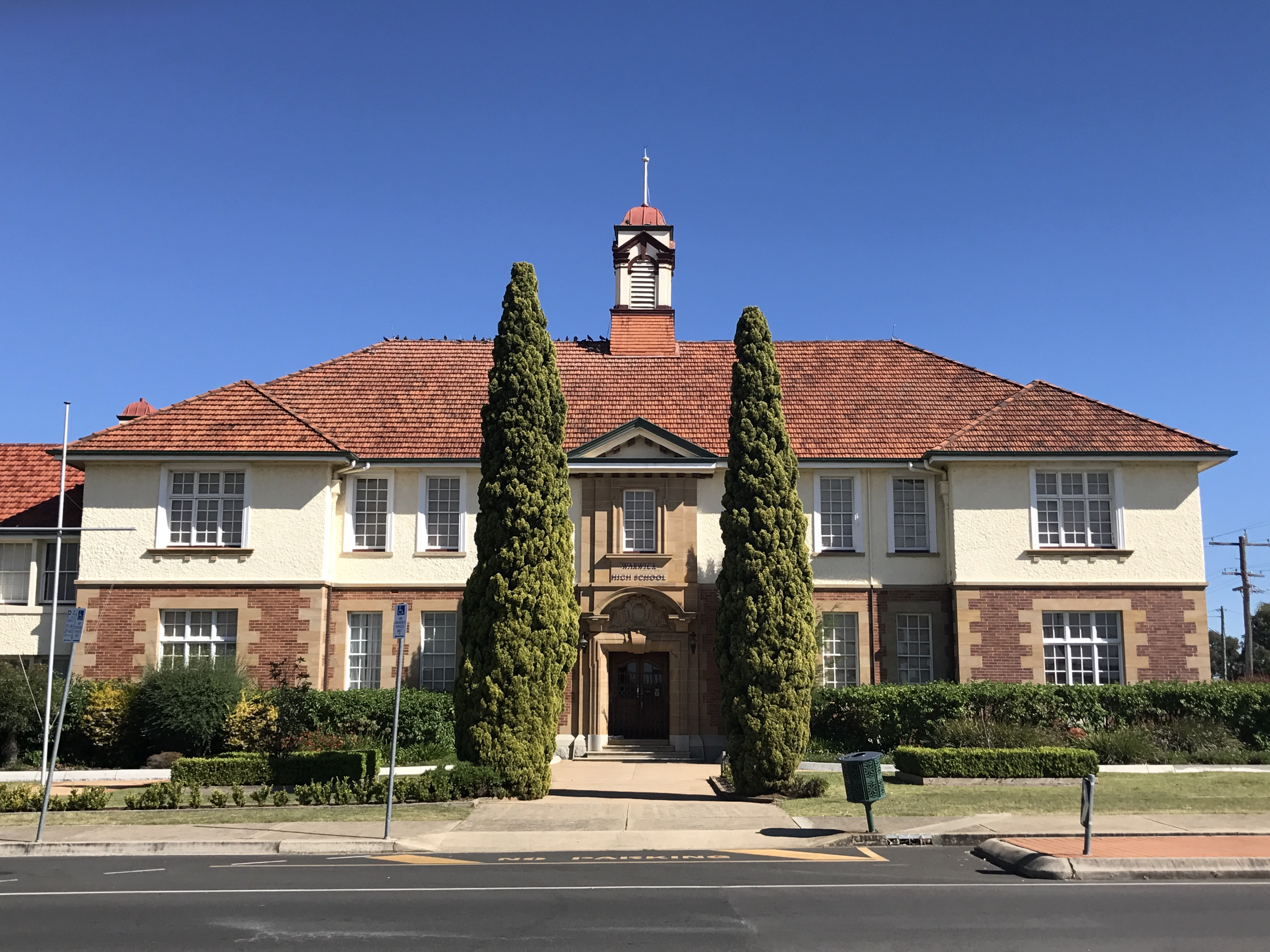
Warwick High School, a government school in Warwick, Queensland, 2007

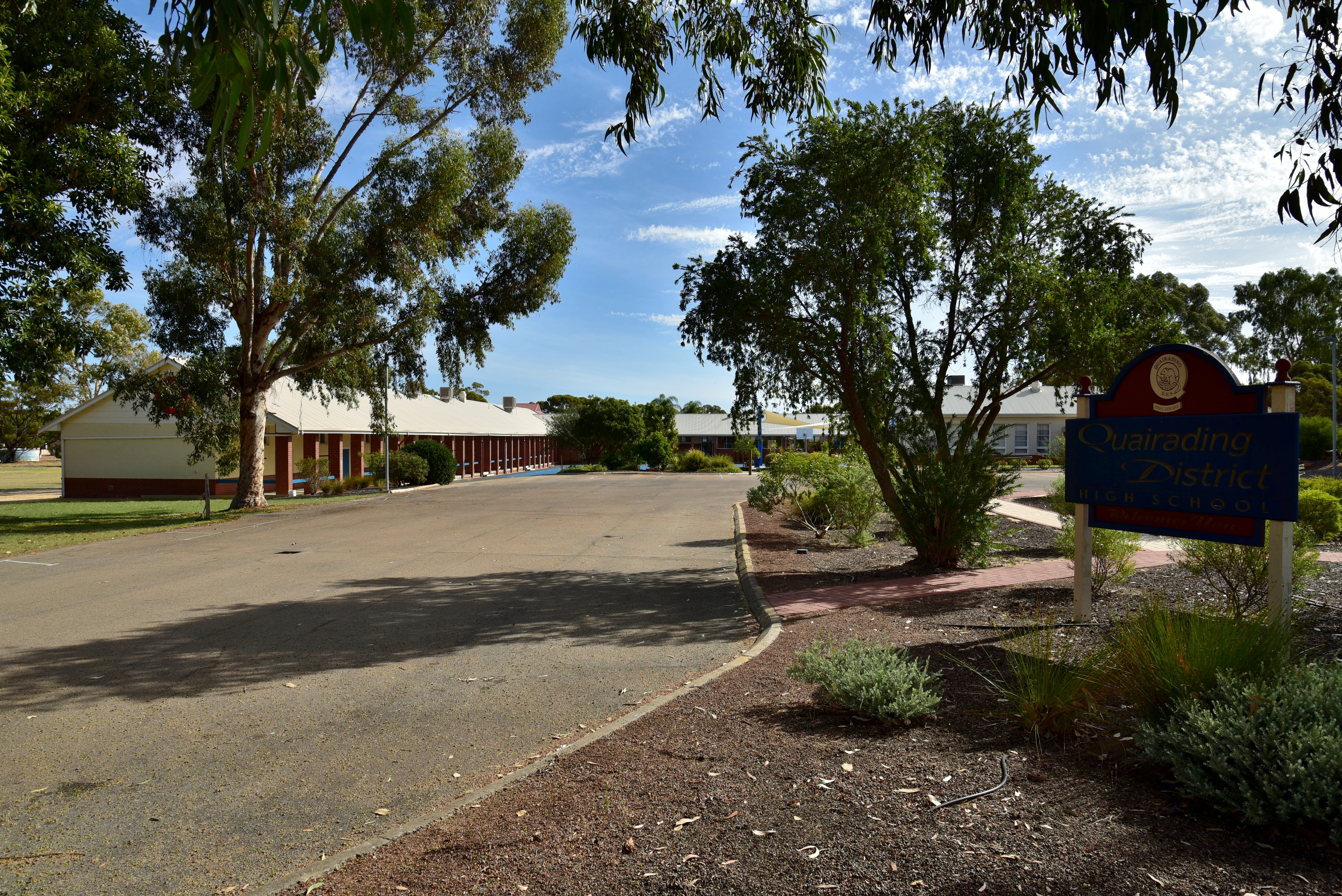
Quairading District High School, a government school in Quairading, Western Australia, 2018

Also called state schools or public schools, government schools educate approximately two-thirds of all school students in Australia. If a student elects to attend a government school, they are required to attend a school within their local school district unless the student has dispensation to attend another school, usually approved based on academic merit, specialisation, or other reasons, such as a student disability.

Government schools are run by the respective state government agency. They offer free education; however, many government schools ask parents to pay a contribution fee and a materials and services charge for stationery, textbooks, sports, uniforms, school camps and other schooling costs that are not covered under government funding. In 2010 the additional cost for schooling was estimated to be on average $316 per year per child.

Government schools may be further categorised into open or comprehensive schools, selective, special, and specialist schools; all defined below. In 2009 the Western Australia government introduced Independent Public Schools to describe a government school that, while a part of the state education system, was granted a higher degree of decision-making authority than a regular government school. A similar reform was introduced in Queensland and, as of December 2018, 250 government schools commenced as independent public schools in Queensland. In February 2014 the then Federal Education Minister, Christopher Pyne, announced a $70 million Independent Public Schools Initiative to support 1,500 Australian government schools to become more autonomous.

Government hospital schools are located at some major hospitals and provide access to tuition for students who have extended stays in hospitals.

Across Australia, the Federal Department of Education sets the overall national policy and direction for education in Australia. The following state and territory government departments are responsible for the administration of education within their respective jurisdictions:

Government educational authority by state/territory
State/territory	Government educational agency	Other relevant authorities
Australian Capital Territory	ACT Education Directorate	ACT Board of Senior Secondary Studies
New South Wales	NSW Department of Education	NSW Education Standards Authority
Northern Territory	NT Department of Education	
Queensland	QLD Department of Education	Queensland Curriculum and Assessment Authority
South Australia	SA Department for Education	SACE Board of South Australia
Tasmania	Department for Education, Children and Young People	Office of Tasmanian Assessment, Standards and Certification
Victoria	VIC Department of Education	Victorian Curriculum and Assessment Authority
Western Australia	WA Department of Education	School Curriculum and Standards Authority

=== Non-government schools ===
Schools from the non-government sector operate under the authority of state or territory governments but are not operated by government education departments. Schools from the non-government sector may operate as individual schools, in small groups or as a system such as those coordinated by the Catholic Education Commission in each state and territory. All non-government schools in Australia receive funding from the Commonwealth government.

==== Catholic schools ====
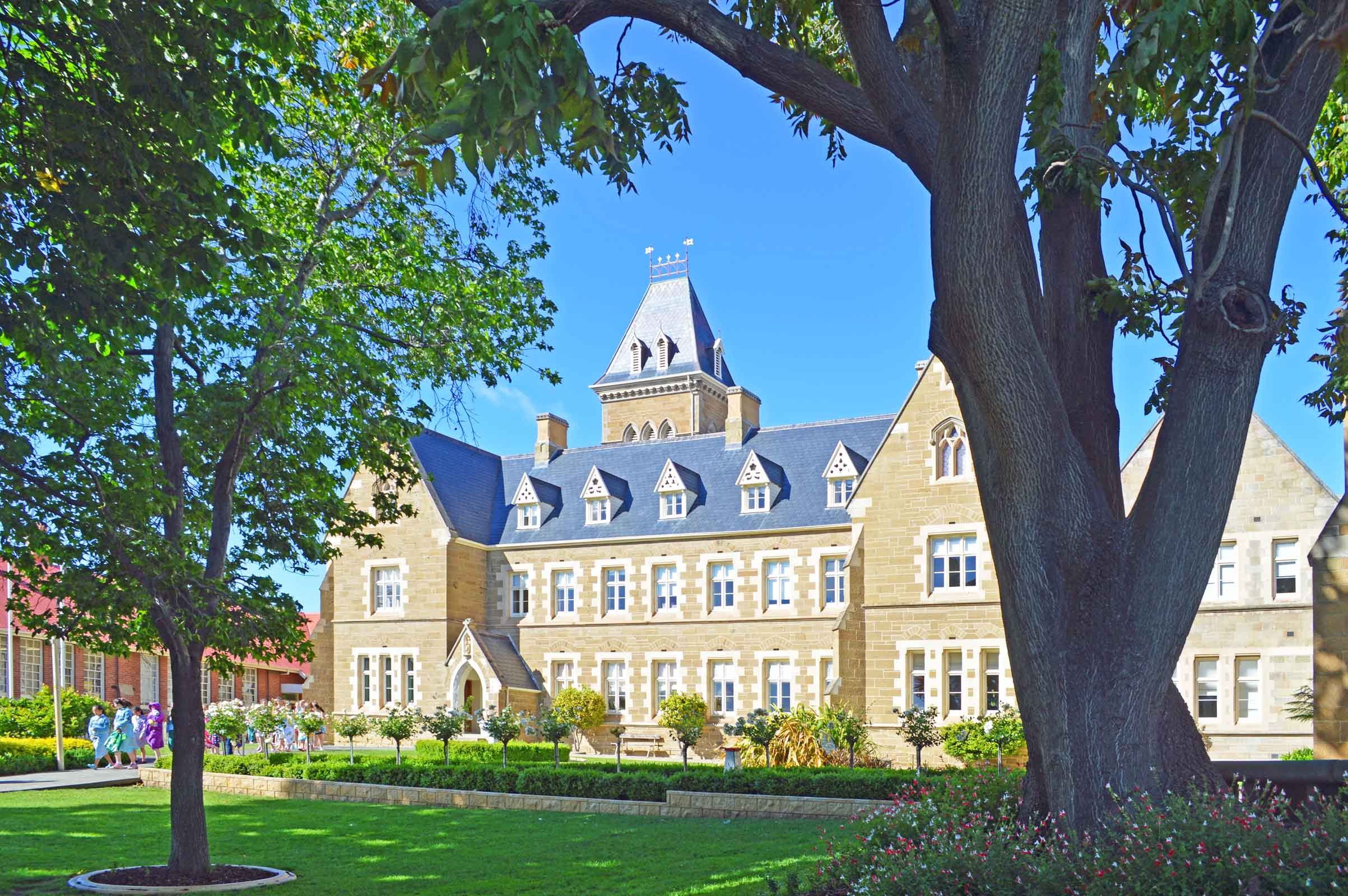
St Mary's College, Hobart, 2014. The college is affiliated with the Presentation Sisters, a religious institute of the Catholic Church.

The education system delivered by the Roman Catholic Church in Australia began in 1820 and has grown to be the second-biggest provider of school-based education in Australia. As of 2018, one in five Australian students attended Catholic schools. There are over 1,700 Catholic schools in Australia with more than 750,000 students enrolled, employing almost 60,000 teachers.

Administrative oversight of Catholic education providers varies depending on the origins, ethos, and purpose of each education provider. Oversight of Catholic systemic schools may rest with a Catholic parish, diocese, or archdiocese; while religious institutes have oversight of Catholic independent schools.

The National Catholic Education Commission (NCEC), established by the Australian Catholic Bishops Conference through the Bishops Commission for Catholic Education, is tasked with maintaining liaison with the federal government and other key national education bodies and complements and supports the work of the state and territory Catholic education commissions. While some Catholic schools operate independently via religious institutes, the majority of Catholic schools, called systemic schools, operate under the Canon Law jurisdiction of an ecclesiastical public juridic person, such as a bishop. In practice, the bishop assigns a Catholic Education Office (CEO), Catholic Education Commission, Catholic Schools Offices, or a similar body with daily operational responsibility for the leadership, efficient operation, and management of the Catholic systemic schools which educate in parish primary and regional secondary schools in Australia. These diocesan bodies are charged with the implementation and management of the policies of the diocese and the allocation and administration of the funds provided by the government and private sources to Catholic systemic schools, as well as the financial responsibilities for the administration of salaries for staff members.

Most Catholic schools (96 per cent) are systemically funded, meaning that the government funding they nominally attract is provided to the relevant state Catholic Education Commission for needs-based distribution. Sixty-one Australian Catholic schools are non-systemically funded (independent schools) and receive government grants directly.

==== Private schools ====
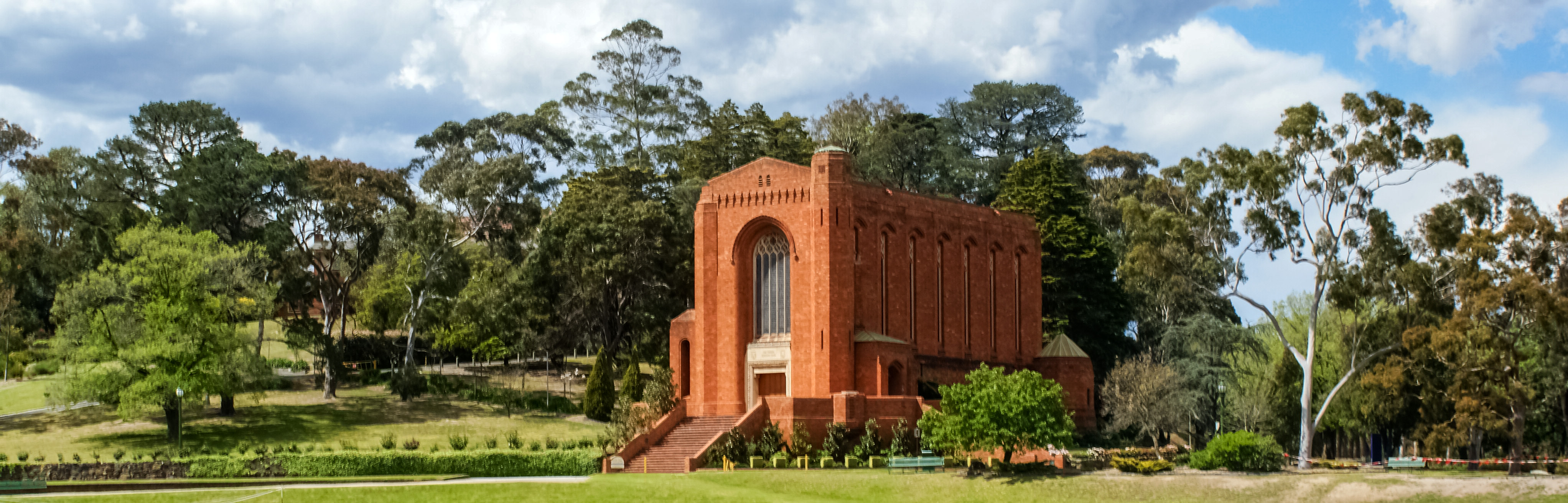
The chapel at Scotch College, Melbourne, a well-known Australian private school, that enrols students from early learning to Year 12

Private schools are non-government schools that are not operated by government authority and have a system of governance that ensures their independent operation. Such schools are typically operated by an independently elected school council or board of governors and range broadly in the type of school education provided and the socio-economics of the school community served. Some private schools are run by religious institutes; others have no religious affiliation and are driven by a national philosophy (such as international schools), pedagogical philosophy (such as Waldorf-Steiner schools), or specific needs (such as special schools). As of 2018, including private schools run by Catholic religious institutes, of the 9,477 schools in Australia 1,140 schools (12 per cent) are in the private sector. In the same year, private schools enrolled over 617,000 students or 16 per cent of the Australian student population.

Private school fees can vary from under $100 per month to $3,200, depending on the student's year level, the school's size, and the socioeconomics of the school community. In late 2018 it was reported that the most expensive private schools (such as the APS Schools, the AGSV Schools in Melbourne, the GPS Schools, QGSSSA Schools in Brisbane and the NSW GPS Schools, Combined Associated Schools and the ISA Schools in Sydney and New South Wales) charge fees of up to $500,000 for the thirteen years of private school education.

Australian private schools broadly fall into the following categories:

Types of Australian private schools
Broad description		Number of Schools	Examples of schools	
Broad description		Number of Schools	Example school(s) name	Examples of religious institute(s) or religious affiliation(s)
Schools affiliated with Christian denominations	Anglican	157	Canberra Grammar School (ACT), The King's School, Parramatta (NSW), The Southport School (QLD), St Peter's College, Adelaide (SA), The Hutchins School (TAS), Geelong Grammar (VIC), and St Hilda's Anglican School for Girls (WA)	
Schools affiliated with Christian denominations	Baptists	40	Redeemer Baptist School (NSW), Glasshouse Christian College (QLD), King's Baptist Grammar School (SA), Carey Baptist Grammar School (VIC), and Kennedy Baptist College (WA)	
Schools affiliated with Christian denominations	Bretheren	20		
Schools affiliated with Christian denominations	Catholic^{[note c]}	63	St Edmund's College, Canberra (ACT), St John's College, Darwin (NT), St Joseph's College, Hunters Hill (NSW), Loreto College Coorparoo (QLD), Sacred Heart College, Adelaide (SA), St Mary's College, Hobart (TAS), Xavier College (VIC), and Trinity College, Perth (WA)	Christian Brothers, Missionaries of the Sacred Heart, Daughters of Our Lady of the Sacred Heart, Marist Brothers, Institute of the Blessed Virgin Mary, Presentation Sisters, Jesuits, and Opus Dei
Schools affiliated with Christian denominations	Greek Orthodox	8	St Spyridon College (NSW) and St George College, South Australia (SA)	
Schools affiliated with Christian denominations	Lutheran	78	St Paul's College, Walla Walla (NSW), Good Shepherd Lutheran School (NT), Trinity Lutheran College (Queensland) (QLD), Concordia College, Adelaide (SA), Eastside Lutheran College (TAS), Lakeside College (VIC), Living Waters Lutheran College (WA)	
Schools affiliated with Christian denominations	Uniting Church	40	Newington College (NSW), St Philip's College (Australia) (NT), Moreton Bay College (QLD), Scotch College, Adelaide (SA), Scotch Oakburn College (TAS), Haileybury, Melbourne (VIC), and Wesley College, Perth (WA)	
Schools affiliated with Christian denominations	Pentecostal	20		
Schools affiliated with Christian denominations	Presbyterian	13	Covenant College, Canberra (ACT), The Scots College (NSW), Brisbane Boys' College (QLD), Scotch College, Adelaide (SA), Scotch College, Melbourne (VIC), and Presbyterian Ladies' College, Perth (WA)	
Schools affiliated with Christian denominations	Seventh-day Adventist	45	Central Coast Adventist School (NSW), Brisbane Adventist College (QLD), Prescott Schools (SA), Hilliard Christian School (TAS), and Nunawading Christian College (VIC)	
Non-denominational Christian schools		426	Covenant Christian School, Canberra (ACT), The Pittwater House School (NSW), Brisbane Christian College (QLD), Wilderness School (SA), Calvin Christian School (TAS), Ruyton Girls' School (VIC), Australian Christian College – Darling Downs (WA)	Westminster Confession of Faith, unaligned, Australian Christian Churches, Life Church Brisbane, and Christian Education Ministries via the Australian Christian Colleges
Islamic schools		58	Malek Fahd Islamic School (NSW), Islamic College of Brisbane (QLD), Islamic College of South Australia (SA), The Islamic Schools of Victoria (VIC), and Australian Islamic College (WA)	
Jewish schools		17	Emanuel School, Australia (NSW), Beth Rivkah Ladies College (VIC), and Carmel School, Perth (WA)	Reform Judaism, Chabad Orthodoxy, and Modern Orthodoxy
Montessori schools		37	Sydney Montessori School (NSW), Queensland Independent College (QLD), Melbourne Montessori School (VIC), Perth Montessori School (WA)	
Steiner schools		51	Orana Steiner School (ACT), Glenaeon Rudolf Steiner School (NSW), Mount Barker Waldorf School (SA), Tarremah Steiner School (TAS), Sophia Mundi Steiner School (VIC)	
Schools constituted under specific Acts of Parliament (such as grammar schools in some states)			Sydney Grammar School (NSW) and Brisbane Grammar School (QLD)	
Indigenous community schools			Kalgoorlie-Boulder Community High School and Karalundi Aboriginal Education Community (WA)	
Schools that specialise in meeting the needs of students with disabilities			Mater Dei Special School (NSW) and Western Autistic School (VIC)	
Schools that cater for students at severe educational risk due to a range of social/emotional/behavioural and other risk factors				

== Specialist organisational structures ==
=== Special schools ===
A special school is a school catering for students who have special educational needs due to learning difficulties, physical disabilities, developmental disabilities or social/emotional disturbance, or who are in custody, on remand or in hospital. Special schools may be specifically designed, staffed and resourced to provide appropriate special education for children with additional needs. Students attending special schools generally do not attend any classes in mainstream schools. The schools cater for students with mild, moderate and profound intellectual disabilities, deaf and hard of hearing students, students with Autism and students with a physical disability. Class sizes at specialist schools are smaller than at mainstream schools, and there is a much lower ratio of teaching and support staff to students. Some specialist schools also have therapists on staff. Specialist schools generally already have an accessible environment and curriculum for their student population; this may mean that there are limited subjects on offer.

=== Selective schools ===
A selective school is a government school that enrols students based on some sort of selection criteria, usually academic. The term may have different connotations in different systems and is the opposite of an open or comprehensive school, which accepts all students, regardless of aptitude.

In New South Wales, student placement in fully and partially selective high schools is highly competitive, with approximately 3,600 places offered to the 15,000 students who sit the Selective High School Test. As of 2019 there were 47 fully or partially selective government high schools, including 17 fully selective high schools (some of which are co-educational and others provide a single-sex educational environment); 25 partially selective high schools (high schools with both selective and comprehensive classes); four selective agricultural high schools; and one virtual selective high school. Of the 47 schools, 34 are located in greater metropolitan Sydney. Of the government selective high schools in New South Wales, James Ruse Agricultural High School is renowned for its academic achievements and competitiveness, as well as a near-perfect record of all students gaining university admission, especially in medicine, law and science. The school has outperformed every high school in New South Wales in the past 20 years in public university entrance examinations.

In Victoria, selective government high schools select all of their students based on an entrance examination. As of 2011, there were four selective schools: Melbourne High School, Mac.Robertson Girls' High School, Nossal High School and Suzanne Cory High School. In addition, there are three special schools namely Victorian College of the Arts Secondary School, John Monash Science School and Elizabeth Blackburn School of Sciences which cater to students opting for focused education in arts and science respectively.

In Queensland, there are four selective entry high schools. Brisbane State High School- established in 1921- which is partially selective, and the three Queensland Academies, which are fully selective- formed during 2007 and 2008. All require entry based on academic entry tests, NAPLAN results, primary school grades, interviews and other considerations.

In Western Australia, selective secondary education (officially named Gifted and Talented Education (GATE)) is operated by the Western Australian Department of Education through the Gifted and Talented Selective Entrance Programs for Year 7, and subject to limited placement availability for year-levels upward to Year 12. All applicants are required to sit the Academic Selective Entrance Test and possibly complete combined interviews, auditions and/or workshops depending on the program(s) applied for. The programs are categorised into three strands: academic, language, and arts. Eighteen government schools participate in the Gifted and Talented Programs, each specialising in one of the strands. All participating schools are partially selective and partially local intake, except for Perth Modern School which is fully selective.

=== Specialist schools ===
Schools that operate specialist education programs exist in all Australian states and territories. These schools are typically associated with the arts or elite sports programs. In South Australia, specialist schools cover the arts, gifted and talented programs, languages, agricultural schools, science, technology, engineering and mathematics, advanced technology project schools, sports schools, and trade training centres. In Victoria, examples of specialist government schools include those focused on science and maths (John Monash Science School), performing arts (Victorian College of the Arts Secondary School), sports (Maribyrnong Secondary College, Western Heights College), and leadership and enterprise (The Alpine School). An alternative model is those sporting organisations that deliver specialist programs to a narrow selection of schools, such as Cricket Australia's Specialist School Program to three Western Australian schools.

=== International schools ===
In Australia, international schools promote international education and may be operated by the government of the country of origin, the government of the state or territory in which the school is located, or be operated as a private school. International schools include those schools that have received international accreditation such as from the Council of International Schools, the International Baccalaureate Organization, or the Western Association of Schools and Colleges, or other similar organisations. As of 2019, approximately 80 Australian schools meet that definition, with the vast majority being schools that offered one or more of the International Baccalaureate programs. Other schools are affiliated with specific cultures or languages, most notably French (e.g. Telopea Park School (ACT), Lycée Condorcet (NSW), Auburn High School (VIC)), German (e.g. German International School Sydney (NSW) and Deutsche Schule Melbourne (VIC)), or Japanese (e.g. Sydney Japanese International School (NSW), The Japanese School of Melbourne (VIC) and The Japanese School in Perth (WA)) schools, including Japanese supplementary weekend schools; or may generally be international in their outlook, including the International Grammar School (NSW) or the International School of Western Australia (WA).

== Mixed-sex and single-sex education ==
In Australia, both government and non-government schools operate co-educational and single-sex educational environments for students. The overwhelming number of schools are co-educational, with a small proportion of government schools operating single-sex schools, sometimes with a separate boys' and girls' school in the same suburb. All government single-sex schools are secondary schools. Examples of adjacent single-sex government secondary schools include Canterbury Boys and Canterbury Girls, North Sydney Boys and North Sydney Girls, and Sydney Boys and Sydney Girls. In Melbourne, there is Melbourne High and Mac.Robertson Girls.

The majority of single-sex schools in Australia are non-government schools, heavily weighted towards private schools, some of which are Catholic private schools. Some Catholic systemic schools are also single-sex schools; however, like government schools, the overwhelming majority are co-educational schools.

== Day and boarding schools ==
In Australia, both government and non-government schools operate day and boarding schools. As of 2019, of the 10,584 registered schools operating in Australia, approximately 250 schools (or less than 2.5 per cent) were boarding schools. Some Australian schools offer gender-specific (boys' [approximately 21 per cent] or girls' [approximately 28 per cent]) and co-educational boarding schools (51 per cent); with multi-modal options, such as full-time boarding and part-time boarding (for example, going home on the weekends) offered by some schools. Some specialist education schools, such as The Australian Ballet School, offer boarding facilities. The largest peak body for boarding schools in Australia, the Australian Boarding Schools Association, claimed that, in 2017, there were 22,815 students in boarding schools covered by the association, an increase from 19,870 in 2014.

== Qualifications ==
Within the context of the Australian Qualifications Framework, each state and territory is responsible for issuing certificates and/or qualifications to secondary students, collectively referred to as the Senior Secondary Certificate of Education. The following table serves as a summary of the qualifications issued by each state or territory:

Qualifications by state/territory
State/territory	Did not graduate Year 12	Graduated from Year 12	Trade-based secondary qualifications	Notes
ACT	Statement of Achievement	ACT Senior Secondary Certificate and Record of Achievement (ACT SSC)	VET Certificates and Statements of Attainment	
NSW	Record of School Achievement	NSW Higher School Certificate (HSC)		
NT		NT Certificate of Education and Training (NTCET)^{[note d]}		
QLD	Queensland Certificate of Individual Achievement (QCIA)	Queensland Certificate of Education (QCE)		
SA		South Australian Certificate of Education (SACE)^{[note d]}		
TAS	Tasmanian Qualifications Certificate (TQC)	Tasmanian Certificate of Education (TCE)		
VIC	Victorian Pathways Certificate (VPC)	Victorian Certificate of Education (VCE)	Victorian Certificate of Applied Learning (VCAL) 2002–2023 VCE Vocational Major (VCE-VM) 2023–	
WA	Western Australian Statement of Student Achievement (WASSA)	Western Australian Certificate of Education (WACE)		

As an alternative form (or as an addition to) the government-endorsed certification path, students, by approval, may elect to receive certification under the International Baccalaureate Diploma Programme.

== Basic skills tests (NAPLAN) ==
Australia's system of national assessments, the National Assessment Program, established by the Australian Education Research Organization, uses four main standardised assessments to measure literacy and numeracy achievement of school students over time: the National Assessment Program – Literacy and Numeracy (abbreviated as NAPLAN), the Programme for International Student Assessment (PISA), the Trends in International Mathematics and Science Study (TIMSS) and the Progress in International Reading Literacy Study (PIRLS).

The NAPLAN is a series of tests focused on basic skills that are administered annually to Australian students. These standardised tests assess students' reading, writing, language (spelling, grammar and punctuation) and numeracy. Introduced in 2008, NAPLAN is administered by the Australian Curriculum, Assessment and Reporting Authority (ACARA) and is overseen by the Council of Australian Governments (COAG) Education Council. The tests are designed to determine if Australian students are achieving outcomes. and to be carried out on the same days across Australia in any given year. Parents can decide whether their children take the test or not. The vast majority of Year 3, 5, 7 and 9 students participate. One of the aims of NAPLAN is to prepare young children for competitive examinations.

Unlike NAPLAN, PISA; TIMSS; and PIRLS are international assessments that target small samples of students to compare their results with those of samples of students around the world. While PISA is not necessarily intended to assess their understanding of the Australian Curriculum, TIMSS and PIRLS are designed to address the degree to which students retain and understand the Curriculum contents.

== School education to international students ==
In Australia, a student is considered as an international student if they study at an approved educational institution and they are not an Australian citizen, Australian permanent resident, New Zealand citizen, or a holder of an Australian permanent resident humanitarian visa. Under the Education Services for Overseas Students Act 2000 (Cth), the Australian Government regulates the delivery of school and tertiary education to international students who are granted a student visa to study in Australia. The government maintains the Commonwealth Register of Institutions and Courses for Overseas Students (CRICOS) and, as of 2018, there were 396 school providers with an overall approved capacity of 88,285 students. While Australia as an education destination showed strong and sustained growth over many years, as of June 2019, school-based education fell by three per cent for the year, and represented approximately three per cent of all international student enrolments, with tertiary education, vocational education and training, and English Language Intensive Courses for Overseas Students (ELICOS) accounting for 93 per cent of all enrolments and recording 21 per cent annual growth.

== Issues in Australian school education ==
=== School funding ===
In 2010 the Gillard government commissioned David Gonski to the chair a committee to review funding of Australian schools. Entitled the Gonski Report, through the Council of Australian Governments the Gillard government sought to implement the National Education Reform Agreement that would deliver an A$9.4 billion school funding plan. Despite some states and territories becoming parties to the Agreement, the plan was shelved following the 2013 federal election. The Turnbull government commissioned Gonski in 2017 to chair the independent Review to Achieve Educational Excellence in Australian Schools, commonly called Gonski 2.0. The government published the report on 30 April 2018. Following negotiation, bilateral agreements between the Commonwealth of Australia with each state and territory commenced on 1 January 2019, with the exception of Victoria, whose bilateral agreement commenced on 1 February 2019. The funding agreements provide states with funding for government schools (20 percent) and non-government schools (80 percent) taking into consideration annual changes in enrolment numbers, indexation and student or school characteristics. A National School Resourcing Board was charged with the responsibility of independently reviewing each state's compliance with the funding agreement(s).

The tenth anniversary of the Gonski report in May 2022 led to criticism of successive state governments failure to implement its recommendations. In 2024–25, the Australian Government invested A$53 billion (7.2% of its federal budget) in education. 96.3% of gross income for government schools was government funds in 2022, as was 76.4% for Catholic schools and 48.7% for independent schools. In January 2025 South Australia and Victoria signed on to the new school funding agreement with the Albanese government (after the previous agreement had expired in 2024), which lifts federal funding of public schools to 25 per cent from 20 per cent, under the Better and Fairer Schools Agreement (BFSA). NSW signed up in early March, and Queensland was the last state to make the commitment, on 24 March 2025. Under the BFSA, states are required to increase their funding of public schools to 75 per cent of the minimum amount recommended by the 2012 Gonski Review and Gonski 2.0 per the SRS. This means that they will be "fully funded" according to the Gonski model.

=== Indigenous primary and secondary education ===
Aboriginal and Torres Strait Islander children are at a significant disadvantage when compared to non-Indigenous Australians across a number of key school educational measures. In 2008, the Council of Australian Governments announced seven^{[note e]} "Closing the Gap" targets, of which four related to education, namely:

1. participation in early childhood education: with the goal of 95 per cent of all Indigenous four-year-olds enrolled in early childhood education by 2025;^{[note f]}
2. reading, writing and numeracy levels: with the goal to halve the gap for Indigenous students in reading, writing and numeracy within a decade (by 2018);
3. Year 12 attainment: with the goal to halve the gap for Indigenous 20–24 year olds in year 12 or equivalent attainment rates (by 2020); and
4. school attendance: with the aim to close the gap between Indigenous and non-Indigenous school attendance within five years (by 2018).^{[note c]}

As of 2018, the target results were:

National Indigenous Reform Agreement: Performance data (Closing the gap)
Measure		2017–18 results	
Measure		Indigenous	Non- Indigenous
The proportion of children who are enrolled in (and attending, where possible to measure) a pre-school program in state-specific year before formal schooling		95.0%	89.9%
Percentage of students at or above the minimum standard in reading, writing and numeracy for Years 3, 5, 7 & 9		unavailable^{[note g]}	
Attainment of Year 12 or equivalent	Major cities	73.8%	90.9%
Attainment of Year 12 or equivalent	Inner regional	65.1%	83.0%
Attainment of Year 12 or equivalent	Outer regional	64.5%	82.1%
Attainment of Year 12 or equivalent	Remote	51.0%	82.2%
Attainment of Year 12 or equivalent	Very remote	42.6%	84.2%
Attendance rates: Year 1 to Year 12		82.3%	92.5%

=== Bilingual education in schools ===
Bilingual education in Australia may be divided into three different types, or target audiences, each having somewhat different purposes: Aboriginal and Torres Strait Islander peoples; immigrant (CALD) groups; and English speakers looking to add another language to their education. The first two are interested in language maintenance and language revitalisation for ensuing generations.

The first recorded government support for bilingual education came under the Menzies government in 1950, when the first government schools for Aboriginal students were opened at four sites in the Northern Territory (NT), where instruction "should include English Language, Native Language (where appropriate)". Policies and practices varied in the following years, with the first five pilot programs introduced in 1973 after the Whitlam government came to power and brought in new federal policies.

In the Northern Territory (the jurisdiction with the greatest proportion of Indigenous people, and many remote communities), bilingual programs for Indigenous students begun with Federal Government support in the early 1970s. Yirrkala Community School was identified as the first to undergo bilingual accreditation in 1980, and bilingual students outperformed the non-bilingual students. However, by December 1998 the Northern Territory Government had announced its decision to shift A$3 million away from the 29 bilingual programs to a Territory-wide program teaching English as a second language. Within 12 months though the government had softened its position, after people took to the streets in protest.

From around 2000, most bilingual programs were allowed to continue under the names "two-way education", or "both-ways" learning. Other programs included language maintenance and language revitalisation in remote schools across the NT.

Then on 24 August 2005, the Minister for Employment, Education and Training announced that the government would be "revitalising bi-lingual education" at 15 Community Education Centres: Alekarenge, Angurugu, Borroloola, Gapuwiyak, Gunbalanya, Kalkaringi, Lajamanu, Maningrida, Milingimbi, Ramingining, Ngukurr, Shepherdson College, Numbulwar, Yirrkala, and Yuendumu. This revitalisation is conceived as part of an effort aimed at "providing effective education from pre-school through to senior secondary at each of the Territory's 15 Community Education Centres".

However, in October 2008, the first year of NAPLAN testing, despite the NT Indigenous Education Strategic Plan 2006–2009 supporting bilingual instruction, it was mandated by the NT Government that English should be the language of instruction in all NT schools for the first four hours of the school day. After legal challenges, an AIATSIS Symposium on Bilingual Education in 2009, media coverage and much debate, the policy was replaced by a new policy: "Literacy for Both Worlds", but that was soon withdrawn again. There was intervention by the Australian Human Rights Commission, and in 2012 the House of Representatives Standing Committee on Aboriginal and Torres Strait Islander affairs issued a report which included the recommendation that: "Indigenous language education should be introduced to all schools with Aboriginal students, and indigenous languages included as an official Closing the Gap measure".

Prominent schools involved in bilingual education programs in the NT include Yirrkala Community Education Centre (CEC) and Shepherdson College on Galiwin'ku. Yirrkala School and its sister school ignored the government directive, and has continued to teach its "both ways" methodology. The students' first language, Yolngu Matha, is taught alongside English. The method has proven effective against reducing the drop-out rate, and in 2020 eight students were the first in their community to graduate year 12 with scores enabling them to attend university. Yirrkala School and its sister school, Laynhapuy Homelands School, are now being looked to as models for learning in remote traditional communities. Areyonga School, in Areyonga, was still using both-ways education in August 2023, 50 years since it had begun there, teaching in Pitjantjatjara language and culture.

In March 2025, Yuendemu School celebrated 50 years of bilingual education. The Warlpiri language has been taught alongside English first by Tess Napurrurla Ross and then her daughter Theresa Napurrurla Ross over these years.

As of 2025, bilingual education funding in the Northern Territory has been merged into general school budgets, meaning that each school makes decisions about funding such programmes.

=== Religious education in government schools ===
Constitutionally, Australia is a secular country. Section 116 of Chapter V. The States in the Australian Constitution reads:

The Commonwealth shall not make any law for establishing any religion, or for imposing any religious observance, or for prohibiting the free exercise of any religion, and no religious test shall be required as a qualification for any office or public trust under the Commonwealth.

Nevertheless, Australia maintains one of the highest concentrations of religious schools, when compared with other OECD countries. Historically, the teaching of religion in Australian government schools has been a contentious issue and was a motivator for the foundation of the government schooling system.

While the National School Chaplaincy Program provides an overarching framework based on pastoral care, not religious instruction, the practices and policies of religious instruction in Australian schools vary significantly from state to state. In New South Wales, the Special Religious Education classes are held in the government school sector that enable students to learn about the beliefs, practices, values and morals of a chosen religion. In Queensland, religious organisations may apply to school principals and, if approved, deliver approved religious instruction programs in government schools. In Victoria, legislation prescribes that government schools must not promote any particular religious practice, denomination or sect, and must be open to adherents of any philosophy, religion or faith. However, individual school principals may permit approved organisations to deliver non-compulsory special religious instruction classes of no more than 30 minutes per week per student, during lunchtime or in the hour before or after usual school hours. In Western Australia, both special religious education (not part of the general curriculum) and general religious education (as part of the general curriculum) are offered in government schools.

=== School violence ===
In July 2009, the Queensland Minister for Education said that the rising levels of violence in schools in the state were "totally unacceptable" and that not enough had been done to combat violent behaviour. In Queensland, 55,000 school students were suspended in 2008, nearly a third of which were for "physical misconduct".

In South Australia, 175 violent attacks against students or staff were recorded in 2008. Students were responsible for deliberately causing 3,000 injuries reported by teachers over two years from 2008 to 2009.

As of 2024, school violence is still prevalent. In an annual survey by the Australian Catholic University (ACU) 48 per cent of school principals reported having seen or experienced an event of physical violence.

== Tertiary education ==
People attending a tertiary institution as a percentage of the local population at the 2011 census, geographically subdivided by statistical local area

Tertiary education (or higher education) in Australia is primarily study at university or at a registered training organisation provider (known as technical and further education, TAFE) leading to a degree, diploma, certificate or other qualification. A higher education provider is a body that is established or recognised by or under the law of the Australian Government, a state, the Australian Capital Territory or the Northern Territory. VET providers, both public and private are registered by state and territory governments.

In 2021, 1,185,450 students were attending university or other higher education. There are 42 universities in Australia: 37 public universities, 3 private universities and 2 international private universities, As of 2015, the largest university in Australia was Monash University in Melbourne: with five campuses and 75,000 students. The Group of Eight (Go8) is a coalition of eight prestigious Australian universities established in 1999 which comprise more than two-thirds of the country's university research.

There are non-self-accrediting higher education providers accredited by state and territory authorities, numbering more than 132 as listed on state and territory registers. These include several that are registered in more than one state and territory.

All students doing nationally recognised training need to have a Unique Student Identifier (USI).

=== International tertiary students ===
Australia has the highest ratio of international students per head of population in the world by a large margin, with 812,000 international students enrolled in the nation's universities and vocational institutions in 2019. Accordingly, in 2019, international students represented on average 26.7% of the student bodies of Australian universities. International education, therefore, represents one of the country's largest exports and has a pronounced influence on the country's demographics, with a significant proportion of international students remaining in Australia after graduation on various skill and employment visas. The Australian onshore international education sector is predicted to rise to 940,000 by 2025. The biggest source markets for onshore international learner enrolments in 2025 were expected to be China, India, Vietnam, Thailand, Nepal, Malaysia, Brazil and South Korea. According to a 2016 report by Deloitte Access Economics for the Australian Trade and Investment Commission, higher education and Vocational Education and Training (VET) were projected to be the fastest-growing sectors in onshore international education by 2025. Australian Government is also planning to add another 1.46 billion AUD according to Modern Manufacturing Strategy, which predicts a high jump in job growth and migration of people.

=== Rankings ===
The Education Index, published with the UN's Human Development Index in 2018, based on data from 2017, listed Australia as 0.929, the second-highest in the world. Australian school students placed 16th in the world in reading, 29th in maths, and 17th in science in the 2018 PISA study by the OCED. The Australian Education Union accredits decreases in government funding for declining student outcomes.

Thirty-six Australian tertiary educational institutions were listed in the QS World University Rankings for 2021; and 37 institutions were listed in the Times Higher Education World University Rankings in the same year. As of 2020, 34 Australian universities were listed in China's Academic Ranking of World Universities ranking, with The University of Melbourne achieving the highest global ranking, at 35th. In the same year, according to the U.S. News & World Report Best Global Universities Rankings, 38 Australian universities were ranked, ranging from the University of Melbourne, at 25th place, to Bond University, at 1133th place.

== See also ==
- Australian Flexible Learning Framework
- Education in the Australian Capital Territory
- New South Wales § Education
- Education in South Australia
- Education in Tasmania
- Education in Victoria
- Education in Western Australia
- Gwyneth Dow
- History of state education in Queensland
- Homeschooling and distance education in Australia
- Lists of schools in Australia
- Music education in Australia
- Reconciliation education
- Safe Schools Coalition Australia
- Tertiary education in Australia
- Tertiary education fees in Australia

== Notes ==
- ^[note a] These include: Department of Education, Employment and Training (DEET) (1988), Department of Employment, Education, Training and Youth Affairs (DEETYA) (1996), Department of Education, Training and Youth Affairs (DETYA) (1997), Department of Education, Science and Training (DEST) (2001), Department of Education, Employment and Workplace Relations (DEEWR) (2007), Department of Education (Australia, 2019–2020) (2013), Department of Education and Training (Australia) (2014).
- ^[note b]: In Western Australia, the term district high school refers to schools that enrol students from Year K to Year 10.
- ^[note c]: The schools listed here are Catholic schools that are private schools and administered by a religious institute. It does not include Catholic schools that are systemically administered by a diocese, Catholic Education Office, or Catholic Education Commission.
- ^[note d]: The South Australian Certificate of Education is also taught in Northern Territory secondary schools, where it is known as the Northern Territory Certificate of Education and Training.
- ^[note e]: Initially six targets were set; with the school attendance target set at a subsequent COAG meeting.
- ^[note f]: The initial target of 95% was set in 2008 with the aim to be achieved by 2013. The target was not achieved and was renewed in December 2015 with the aim to be achieved by 2025.
- ^[note g]: The 2018 NAPLAN data were unavailable at the time of publication of the 2017–18 National Indigenous Reform Agreement Performance data report.
