= Australian Children's Education & Care Quality Authority =

Australian statutory body

Australian Children's Education and Care Quality Authority
Statutory authority overview
- Formed: 1 January 2012; 14 years ago
- Preceding Statutory authority: National Childcare Accreditation Council
- Jurisdiction: Commonwealth of Australia
- Headquarters: PO Box 358, Darlinghurst Sydney CBD
- Statutory authority executives: Annette Whitehead, Chair; Gabrielle Sinclair, Chief Executive Officer
- Parent department: Department of Education and Training
- Website: www.acecqa.gov.au

The Australian Children's Education and Care Quality Authority (ACECQA) is an independent statutory authority that assists governments in implementing the National Quality Framework (NQF) for early childhood education and care throughout Australia. Established in 2012, the authority works with the federal, state and territory government departments to:

- implement changes that benefit children birth to 13 years of age and their families;
- monitor and promote the consistent application of the Education and Care Services National Law across all states and territories; and
- support the early childhood education and care sector to improve quality outcomes for children.

ACECQA is ultimately responsible to the Education Council, one of eight Standing Councils established under the Council of Australian Governments arrangements.

== See also ==
- Early Childhood Australia
- List of Australian government entities
- National Quality Standard
- Early Years Learning Framework (EYLF)
- Victorian Early Years Learning and Development Framework (VEYLDF)
