= Footscray City Films =

Film school in Melbourne, Australia

Location
- 1 Kinnear Street, Footscray Victoria, Australia; Melbourne, Victoria; Australia

Information
- School type: Film School, Selective
- Motto: "A film school run by film professionals"
- Established: 1981
- Age range: 18+

Footscray City Films was a film school in Melbourne, Australia situated within the campus of Footscray City College.

== Overview ==
Established in 1981, the school enrolled around 80 students each year and provided qualifications based on the National Industry Training Package in Screen and Media in Certificate IV, Diploma and Advanced Diploma. Students enrolled at the film school work on a minimum of 20 films a year. Graduates of Footscray City Films went on to have successful careers in the Australian Film Industry

== Notable alumni ==
- Adrian Ortega – Film director, "Cerulean Blue"
- Timothy Spanos – Film Writer/Director, "Boronia Boys"
- Cameron Nugent – Film Writer/Director, "A Boy Called Sailboat"
- Amiel Courtin-Wilson – Film director
- Megan Spencer – Documentary film maker, journalist and radio presenter
- Timothy Grucza – Emmy award-winning cameraman and documentary film maker
- Ben Rylan – Radio and television presenter, producer and journalist
