= Tattooing requirements =

Legal aspects of tattooing

Cosmetic tattooing is also known as permanent makeup (PMU) and semi-permanent makeup (SPMU). It is a global industry with a market size for treatments estimated at US$2.5B in 2024. and reaching US$4B in 2029. Treatment types include the cosmetic tattooing of eyebrows, lips, eyeliner, the scalp, nipple-areola (especially for mastectomy patients) and other paramedical treatments.

The qualifications and requirements to practice as a cosmetic tattooist range from none through to formal registration and licensing. Regulated requirements are typically administered at the local authority level, often with substantial differences across a state or country, as in the USA.

Jurisdictions may require practitioners to complete a professional or accredited training course without being specific. Formal qualifications are not available in most countries, with the United Kingdom and Australia being notable exceptions.

Most jurisdictions require training in infection control, hygiene and/or the control of bloodborne pathogens. Cosmetic tattooing is a high-risk skin penetration procedure requiring sound practice to avoid the transfer of infectious agents.

Premises and business licence requirements are common, with many jurisdictions requiring compliance with health and hygiene standards or regulations. These requirements are typically administered by local authorities (councils, counties).

== National, state, and local authorities ==
Cosmetic tattooing is a voluntary cosmetic treatment. Medical and healthcare authorities are typically not responsible for the regulation of tattooing, other than in the prevention of infection. Requirements for an appropriate level of technical and professional skill may not be defined. Local authorities administer regulations requiring practitioners to have adequate training in infection control and assess the compliance of business premises with hygiene requirements.

=== United States of America ===
According to the Society of Permanent Cosmetic Professionals (SPCP), the requirements for licensing, training (including infection control/licensing) and equipment and products vary by state and by county. The Food & Drug Administration (USFDA) regulates pigments (inks) as cosmetics but does not approve of any pigments for injection into the skin.

There are approximately 3,244 counties in the United States. Texas alone has 254. Most counties require technicians to have bloodborne pathogen (BBP) exposure control training. Online courses are available from organisations including the Red Cross. States and counties may require BBP training that is specific to tattooing, such as in California. California has a Safe Body Art Act. In Los Angeles practitioners are required to get county Body Art Practitioner Registration, and work in a facility with a valid Health Permit.

=== United Kingdom ===
Cosmetic tattooing is not nationally regulated.

The UK Qualification Framework includes a National Standard Level 4 qualification in micropigmentation (cosmetic tattooing). Qualifications are awarded and assessed by organisations such as the Vocational Training Charitable Trust (VTCT). Level 4 is equivalent to the first year of a bachelor's degree or an HNC (Higher National Certificate). Local councils require this qualification or an equivalent for the purposes of obtaining a licence to operate a tattooing business (includes micropigmentation). An example of licence requirements is provided by Leicester City Council. The Level 4 qualification in micropigmentation is required by East Suffolk Council.

In September 2025 the UK House of Commons issued a briefing paper on the regulaiton of non-surgical cosmetic procedures in England. This would require micropigmentation practitioners to be licensed. The Department of Health and Social Care was authorised to introduce a licencing regime for non-surgical cosmetic procedures in England under the Health and Care Act in 2022.

=== Australia ===
In Australia, the Diploma of Cosmetic Tattooing provides a formal nationally accredited qualification and was introduced in December 2021. It is the first full qualification in cosmetic tattooing in Australia.

The diploma is delivered by Registered Training Organisations (RTOs) under the Australian Qualifications Framework as administered by the Australia Skills Quality Authority (ASQA).

There are no prerequisites for the diploma, which forms part of the SHB Hairdressing and Beauty Services Package. The only previous accredited training available in Australia was the Unit of Competency SHBBSKS003 Design and provide cosmetic tattooing, formerly an elective in the Beauty Therapy Diploma.

Regulated requirements to operate as a cosmetic tattooist are currently infection control training and premises licencing under health regulations according to the applicable state or territory. Health regulations for skin penetration treatments are administered by local councils. Premises may be inspected by Environmental Health Officers.

There are 567 local councils in Australia. An example is Brisbane City Council, the largest local council in Queensland, Australia and in the southern hemisphere. The council is responsible for administering the Queensland Health regulations.

=== Europe ===
Kluger, Bruel and Beauvois, 2020 provide a table indicating the status of regulatory requirements for tattooing in each European country. Most countries require technicians to meet hygiene standards for their premises and infection control and/or protection against bloodborne pathogens. The regulations for body art tattooists are often applied to cosmetic tattooists.

In Denmark technicians must complete a professional course approved by authorities. German authorities indicate that professional training is expected. Holland identifies that formal training is recommended. Norwegian authorities indicate that technicians should complete a professional course, and in Switzerland, authorities require two years' experience for a technician to practice as a micro-dermapigmentologist.

=== Other countries ===
The requirements to practice as a cosmetic tattooist in other countries range from unspecified or indeterminate to specific and are usually the same as for body art tattooing. In some countries (e.g., Maldives), all forms of tattooing are specifically banned. Columbia requires a Ministry of Health tattoo licence as well as a comprehensive training program, with proof plus an exam. Canada requires recognised and reputable training.

Countries governed by French law typically indicate similar regulatory requirements to France. India requires technicians to complete a professional training course in cosmetic tattooing. Mexico requires Certification by the National Council of Permanent Makeup. South Africa requires technicians to complete a professional training course.

In Saudi Arabia there is some distinction between body art tattooing, which is forbidden, and cosmetic tattooing which is popular and administered under the requirements of the Saudi Food and Drug Authority (SFDA). The SFDA also states that cosmetics must comply with Halal certification, which prohibits alcohol (non-food alcohol amy be present in cosmetic tattoo pigments).

In Japan in 2017, legislation was passed requiring all cosmetic tattooing to be undertaken by medical practitioners. Following arrests including cosmetic tattooists the legislation was challenged and overturned in 2020 by the Supreme Court
