= National Training System (Australia) =

Australian system for vocational education and training

The National Training System is the Australian system for vocational education and training (VET) under the VET Quality Framework (VQF), in which employers, the States of Australia, and the Commonwealth Government, formalise a curriculum available for Registered Training Organisations (RTOs) to teach and assess the competency of students.

The Australian Quality Training Framework (AQTF) sets the standards for the operation of training organisations registered to deliver training services and to issue VET qualifications. Training products include national training packages and accredited courses which outline the qualifications, competencies and assessment criteria for specific areas of training. These two dimensions form the National Skills Framework. The National Quality Council is responsible for overseeing the effective operation of the Framework. Training received and certified under the framework is 'portable' across state boundaries and industries.

All students doing nationally recognised training need to have a Unique Student Identifier (USI).

== Training organisations ==
Australia has a system of Technical and Further Education colleges, which offers courses in most larger towns and cities at technical schools and community colleges.

Additionally, individuals and companies can be accredited as a Registered Training Organisation and offer courses and modules of training.

== Hierarchy ==
The courses available are listed by the . The hierarchy of courses available for VET under the Australian Qualifications Framework is:

- Advanced Diploma
- Diploma
- Certificate (ranked 1–4, with 4 being the highest)

The training packages at the Cert II-IV levels offer options as well as the mandatory courses. A person founding out their training would be able to group these extra training courses and be assessed for additional or higher certificates.

Hence:

- Certificate 1 is a basic qualification, necessarily linked to other simple vocational competencies. Example:, Cert I in Furnishing
- Certificate 2 is a trade-specific competency, that would be linked to other competencies to become a trade qualification. Example: Cert II in Furniture Finishing
- Certificate 3 is a trade qualification, wherein several competencies are brought together as a demonstrated trade. Example: Cert III in Furniture Making (Cabinet Making)
- Certificate 4 demonstrates the person's qualification in a field of vocational education and training. Example: Cert IV in Furnishing Technology (that brings together a group of skills and workplace leadership competencies.)

== Recognition of prior learning ==
A person's experience can also be assessed without formal training under a system of "recognition of prior learning" (RPL). In such cases, the assessor (who would hold a Training & Assessment qualification at a minimum of Certificate IV in Training and Assessment - TAE40122 from the Training and Education Training Package TAE) can take evidence of the person's abilities, experience, and training the particular skill area, plus similar and other fields, and issue a certificate; or, require the person to undertake certain courses to round out the person's competencies before the issue of a certificate.

== History ==
The RPL for history in Australia dates back to 1993 when it was first introduced by the Australian Government as part of a National Qualifications Framework.

RPL has been the mainstay of all assessments conducted under national vocational education and training systems since the late 1980s and continues to evolve as different VET systems evolve. It was first introduced into the UK by Susan Simosko, a consultant with the National Council for Vocational Qualifications, who adapted it as the central element of all competency-based assessments. A similar process was adopted by all countries during the development of their own vocational education and training systems, some aligned solely with the need to assess competence in line with the needs of private and public sector organisations, and others as a critical element of the assessment of skills and knowledge in order to grant vocational qualifications.

As of 2015, it is part of the Australian Quality Training Framework (AQTF) charter and the standards for Registered Training Organisations (RTOs) delivering accredited training. There are numerous companies that offer training online that help Australians get qualified and improve their careers. There is no RPL model that is suitable for all qualifications throughout Australia.
