= Physician Quality Reporting System =

The Physician Quality Reporting System (PQRS), formerly known as the Physician Quality Reporting Initiative (PQRI), is a health care quality improvement incentive program initiated by the Centers for Medicare and Medicaid Services (CMS) in the United States in 2006. It is an example of a "pay for performance" program which rewards providers financially for reporting healthcare quality data to CMS. PQRS ended in 2016, beginning with the 2018 payment adjustment. The Medicare Access and CHIP Reauthorization Act of 2015 (MACRA) replaced this and other CMS quality programs with a new umbrella program called the Quality Payment Program (QPP), under which clinicians formerly reporting under PQRS would instead report quality data under one of two QPP program tracks: the Merit-based Incentive Payment System (MIPS) or the Advanced Alternative Payment Model (APMs) track.

== Background ==
PQRS developed from several pieces of Congressional legislation. In 2006 the Tax Relief and Health Care Act (TRHCA) included a provision for a 1.5% incentive payment to eligible providers who successfully submitted quality data to CMS. This provision included a cap on payments. The 2007 Medicare, Medicaid, and SCHIP Extension Act extended the program through 2008 and 2009. It also removed the TRHCA payment cap. The Medicare Improvements for Patients and Providers Act made PQRS permanent in 2008 and increased the incentive payment to 2%. Initially only an incentive program, in 2010 the Affordable Care Act (ACA) introduced penalties for providers who do not submit qualifying PQRS data. Penalties increase annually according to a schedule and begin two years after the reporting period. Calendar year 2014 was the last year for a PQRS incentive. There is no incentive payment for 2015 PQRS reporting. Beyond 2015, there is potential to obtain an incentive under the Physician Value Based Payment Modifier (VM) program.

== Definition and implementation ==
=== Measure definition ===
In 2015 CMS identified 254 quality measures for which providers may choose to submit data. The measures map to U.S. National Quality Standard (NQS) health care quality domains:

- Communication and Care Coordination
- Community/Population Health
- Effective Clinical Care
- Efficiency and Cost Reduction
- Patient Safety
- Person and Caregiver-Centered Experiences and Outcomes

The requirements for eligibility become more complex over time. For example, in 2013 providers had to submit data on one out of the total possible measures to comply with PQRS; in 2015, they have to submit data on nine of the measures.

=== Eligible providers ===
Because PQRS is a Medicare-based incentive program, only providers who care for patients with Medicare insurance must participate in PQRS. As of 2015, CMS included the following health care practitioners under eligible providers:

- Medicare providers (Physicians (Doctors of Medicine, Osteopathic Medicine), Podiatry, Optometry, Oral Surgery, Dentistry, and Chiropractic)
- Practitioners (Physician Assistant, Nurse Practitioner, Clinical Nurse Specialist, Certified Registered Nurse Anesthetist and Anesthesiologist Assistant, Certified Nurse Midwife, Clinical Social Worker, Clinical Psychologist, Registered Dietitian, Nutrition Professional, Audiologist)
- Therapists (Physical Therapist, Occupational Therapist, Qualified Speech-Language Therapist)

Eligible providers may elect to participate in PQRS as an individual provider or as a group practice.

=== Reporting process ===
CMS allows providers to submit PQRS data through several electronic methods, including claims-based reporting, registry-based reporting from a qualified registry, direct submission from an electronic health record or other IT system vendor, and Group Practice Reporting Option (GPRO) web interface.

== Outcomes ==
CMS reported that out of 1.25 million eligible providers, 460,000 (almost 40%) did not submit PQRS data in 2013, the most recent year for which data is available, as of 2015. Those providers will lose 1.5% in total reimbursements for CMS patients over the next year, while the 642,000 providers who met PQRS criteria will receive a 0.5% increase in CMS reimbursements. CMS also reported that overall participation grew from 15% in 2007.
