= Certificate IV in TESOL =

The Certificate IV in TESOL is an Australian academic qualification for those entering the field of Teaching English as a foreign or second language. Certificate IV in TESOL courses are delivered by a number of Australian Registered training organisations (RTOs), with the qualification being recognised within the Australian Qualifications Framework (AQF).

The Certificate IV in TESOL is also recognised by The Australian National ELT (English Language Teaching) Accreditation Scheme (NEAS) based on it meeting or exceeding NEAS's minimal TESOL certification standards for English Language Teaching. These criteria, which the Certificate IV in TESOL generally meets or exceeds, include:

- no less than 100 contact hours, or the equivalent in Distance Education programs, with a content focus on English language, language learning, TESOL teaching;
- a practical component including at least six hours supervised and assessed practice teaching in TESOL and;
- approved/awarded by a university, approved by government, or a recognised TESOL program such as the Certificate in Teaching English to Speakers of Other Languages (CELTA).

== Standardisation ==
There is a standardisation procedure undertaken during the accreditation process for each Certificate IV in TESOL course - each newly accredited course is monitored by a Community Development Advisory Committee (CDAC). In each case, the CDAC includes reputable members from the English Language Teaching (ELT) industry, thus ensuring that modern ELT methodology and practices are integrated into the design, and that the course meets the NEAS Australia requirements.

The Certificate IV in TESOL course is not available to RTOs as an 'off the shelf' training package by the Australian Qualifications Framework because there is not yet (June, 2011) an AQF TESOL training package. Therefore, each provider designs and registers their own 'enterprise' version. This allows for variation in content and delivery format, as standardised by the CDAC.

The NEAS Australia criteria are very similar to the Accreditation UK criteria for a first-level TEFL qualifications for teachers who want to enter the ELT profession (as listed by the British Council under Teachers' qualifications guidance).

The National Training Information Service (NTIS) provides a database on vocational education and training in Australia. NTIS is the official national register of information on Training Packages, Qualifications, Courses, Units of Competency and Registered Training Organisations (RTOs) and has been developed for experienced training sector users.
