= Department of Public Instruction =

The Department of Public Instruction may refer to:

- Department of Education (Philippines), previously called the Department of Public Instruction
- Department of Education (Queensland). previously called the Department of Public Instruction
