= National Quality Framework =

Australian childcare quality framework

The National Quality Framework (NQF) is part of the Australian Government's agenda for early childhood education and child care focused on providing Australian families with high-quality, accessible and affordable integrated early childhood education and child care. The NQF aims to raise quality and drive continuous improvement and consistency in education and care services through:

- a national legislative framework
- a National Quality Standard
- approved learning frameworks
- a national quality rating and assessment process
- minimum qualifications of staff and educator to child ratios
- a new national body called the Australian Children's Education & Care Quality Authority.

The National Quality Framework took effect on 1 January 2012 with key requirements being phased in over time. Requirements such as qualification, educator-to-child ratios and other key staffing arrangements were phased in between 2012 and 2020. The Early Years Learning Framework version 2 (an approved learning framework) was endorsed and authorised by the Australian Education Ministers in January 2023.

== See also ==
- Early Childhood Australia, the peak early childhood advocacy organisation in Australia
- Early Years Learning Framework
- Victorian Early Years Learning and Development Framework
