= Education in South Australia =

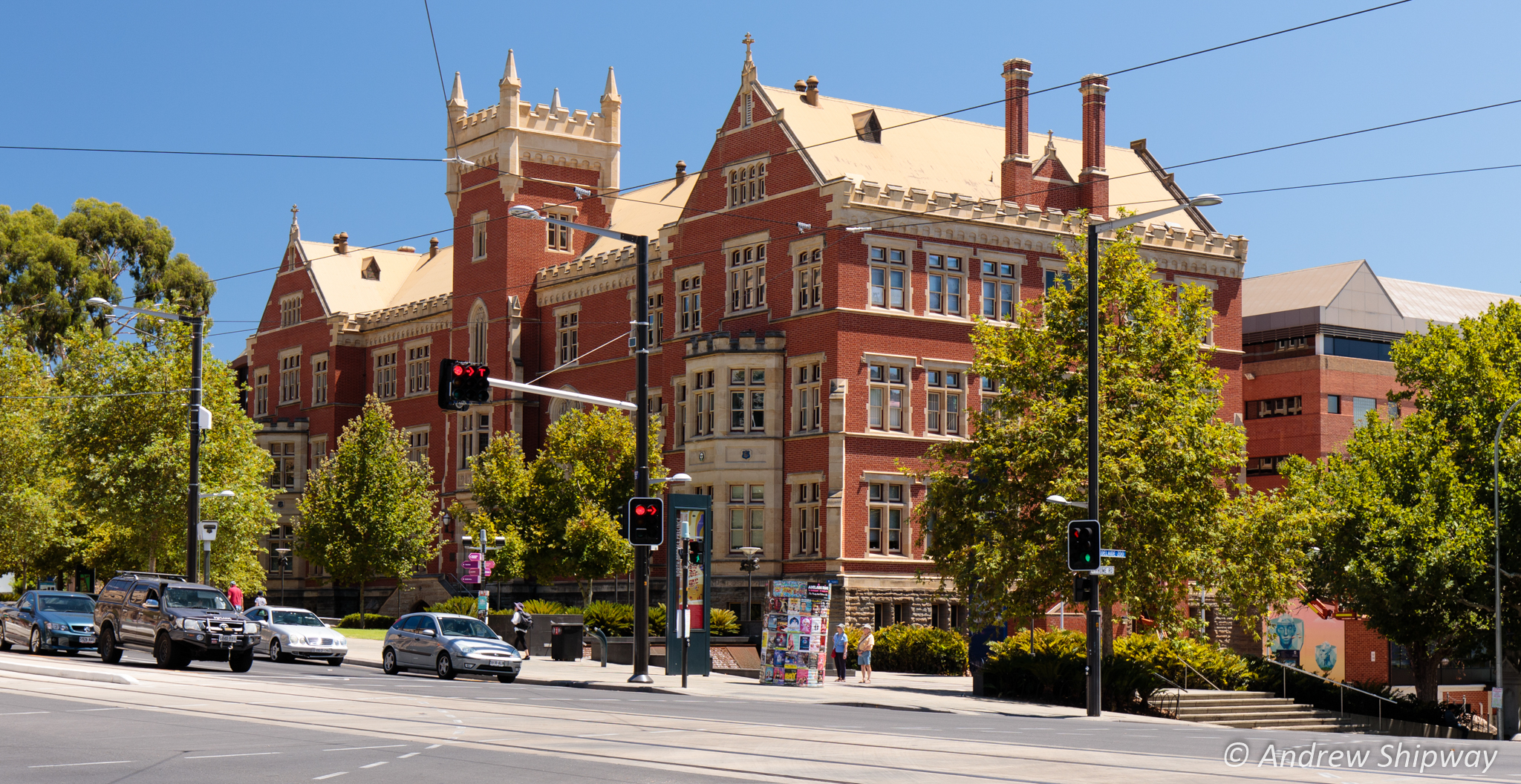
The old School of Mines building, part of the UniSA East campus

Education in South Australia is primarily the responsibility of the South Australian Government.

== Early childhood education ==
Before starting school, children attend child care, or kindergarten (pre school). This is typically between the ages of three and five.

== School education ==
Schooling in South Australia has historically had two tiers, primary school and high school (secondary school). Primary school ranges from reception to grade 7 (5 to 12 years old), from around 2020 moving to grade 6, and high school covers ages 13–18 (moving to 12–18). High school students in Australia are eligible to complete the South Australian Certificate of Education (SACE), with many private schools running International Baccalaureate programs.

Schools are run by the government (public schools), or by private concerns (private schools). Many private schools are run by churches. Public education is free, and while government funding is provided to private schools, parents must generally pay additional fees for their child's attendance at school.

In South Australia it is compulsory for children to be enrolled in school by their sixth birthday. All people under the age of 17 are required to participate in full-time schooling, training or work for at least 25 hours per week. As of 2022 parents and guardians are responsible for the regular attendance of all children in their care between the ages of 6 and 16 years, under the Education and Children's Services Act 2019 (SA).

== Tertiary education ==
Tertiary education is principally provided by the state's two public universities, three private universities, and TAFE SA. The state's two main universities are the Adelaide University and Flinders University. The University of South Australia and the University of Adelaide merged on 1 January 2026 to become Adelaide University.

=== Public universities ===
The public universities also have other campuses in the metropolitan area, around the state, inter-state and overseas.

Metropolitan campuses include:

Flinders: Bedford Park; Victoria Square.
Adelaide: The Waite at Urrbrae; Research Park at Thebarton; and The National Wine Centre in the Adelaide Park Lands.
UniSA: Magill Campus (Magill) and Mawson Lakes Campus (Mawson Lakes).

Rural and regional campuses include:

Flinders: The Flinders University Rural Clinical Schools at Mount Gambier, Goolwa and Renmark; and The Lincoln Marine Science Centre at Port Lincoln.
Adelaide: Roseworthy Campus near Roseworthy.
UniSA: Campuses at Mount Gambier and Whyalla.

Interstate campuses include:

Flinders: The university maintains a number of external teaching partnerships in south-west Victoria and the Northern Territory.

Overseas campuses include:

Adelaide: Singapore Campus.

=== Private universities ===
From 2006 to 2022 Carnegie Mellon University ran a campus in Adelaide. There are also private higher education colleges that offer tertiary degrees, such as Tabor College, Millswood.

The Workers' Educational Association of South Australia (WEA-SA) is an independent not-for-profit adult education organisation based in Adelaide. Established in 1913, it is one of Australia's longest running providers of community-based adult learning. WEA-SA delivers short courses, lectures, cultural programs, travel and interest clubs.

- Australian Curriculum
- Education in Australia
- List of schools in South Australia
