= Department of Education (Queensland) =

State education department of the Queensland Government

Department overview
- Formed: 10 September 1875; 150 years ago
- Preceding agencies: Department of Public Instruction; Department of Education and Training; Department of Education, Training and Employment; Department of Education, Training and the Arts
- Jurisdiction: Queensland Government
- Headquarters: 30 Mary Street, Brisbane, Australia
- Ministers responsible: John-Paul Langbroek, Minister for Education and the Arts; TBD, Assistant Minister for Education
- Department executives: Sharon Schimming, acting Director-General; Stacie Hansel, Assistant Director-General
- Child department: Queensland Curriculum and Assessment Authority
- Website: qed.qld.gov.au; education.qld.gov.au; earlychildhood.qld.gov.au

The Department of Education is a ministerial department of the Queensland Government responsible for the administration and quality of education in Queensland, Australia. The department is composed of two separate portfolios, Education Queensland and Early Childhood Education and Care (ECEC). The department also encompasses the Queensland Curriculum and Assessment Authority, a separate statutory authority responsible for creating syllabuses, curriculums, and assessment.

== History ==
In 1875, the Department of Public Instruction was created, providing free, secular and compulsory education to all Queensland children.

In 1957, the Department of Public Instruction was renamed to the Department of Education.

Throughout 1990–1991, the Department of Education went through major restructuring following the release of the report, Focus on Schools.

In February 2004, the Department of Education and the Arts was created.

In 2006–07, the Department of Education, Training and the Arts (DETA) was created.

In 2008–09, machinery of government changes replaced DETA with the Department of Education and Training, which was then restructured into the Department of Education

In October 2015, Premier Annastacia Palaszczuk and Minister for Education Kate Jones released the Advancing education action plan. The plan, which became the foundations of the Advancing education campaign, is described by the department as "a greater focus on active partnerships with the community and strengthening teacher excellence" and has overwhelming support from Queensland citizens. Broadly, the plan focuses on:

- improving the quality and accessibility of early childhood
- increasing participation and passion for STEM subjects and globally-orientated courses such as languages
- ongoing education pathways to universities, vocational education providers, and industry
- lifting literacy and numeracy standards
- improving student wellbeing
- heavy investments in education infrastructure
- improving the standard of teachers and increasing teacher numbers

== Structure and responsibilities ==
The Department of Education is formed from two separate portfolios, Education Queensland and Early Childhood Education and Care, each with separate responsibilities. Broadly, the department is responsible for the administration and quality of state education, and the quality of private education, throughout Queensland.

The head of the department is the minister for education, who has the authority to direct any school to act in the public interest, direct a school to administer assessment, and issue scholarships and allowances. Currently, the director-general is Tony Cook, and the minister for education is Grace Grace. The department is governed by its management board, composed of the director-general, the assistant director-general, all deputy director-generals, and the executive director.

=== Education Queensland ===
Education Queensland, sometimes just called 'Education', is responsible for primary and secondary schooling in Queensland, and the creation and administration of syllabuses and curriculums through the Queensland Curriculum and Assessment Authority.

=== Early Childhood Education and Care ===
Early Childhood Education and Care is responsible for regulating and administering the National Quality Framework (NQF) in Queensland, as well as the Education and Care Services Act 2013 (ECS Act). The NQF stipulates the federal funding and quality of most education and care service providers, and is formed from national law and regulation, and the National Quality Standard. The ECS Act regulates providers and services not covered by the NQF, with the state government funding these services.

Early Childhood Education and Care, as part of their administration of the NQF and ECS Act, provide funding to education and care providers. This funding comes from one of three streams: Queensland Kindergarten Funding Scheme (establishment and ongoing quality of education and care), Kindergarten Inclusion Support Scheme (accessibility resources), or Early Years Services Funding (general services).

== State education fees ==
Under the Education (General Provisions) Act 2006, the cost of state schooling and kindergarten is met by the state for all Australian citizens and permanent residents, and their children. This includes distance education, if living in a remote community. Specialised education is not fully funded by the state government, but the cost may be waived by the chief executive. For those not eligible for state-covered education, the chief executive may issue a charge for education services. The principal of any state school may ask the parent of a student, or the student for adult learners, to make a voluntary contribution towards the administration and maintenance of the school, however there is no requirement for parents to pay, and donations make no difference in the provision of education for a student.

== See also ==
- Education in Australia
- List of schools in Queensland
