= Australian Qualifications Framework =

Educational standards organization

- Website: aqf.edu.au

The Australian Qualifications Framework (AQF) specifies the standards for educational qualifications in Australia. It is administered nationally by the Australian Government's Department of Education, with oversight from the States and Territories, through the Standing Council of Tertiary Education Skills and Employment. While the AQF specifies the standards, education and training organisations are authorised by accrediting authorities to issue a qualification.

== AQF levels ==
The Framework is structured around levels of descriptive criteria, with formal qualifications aligned to the appropriate levels.

Framework
AQF Level	Description summaries	Qualifications	Typical time
Level 1	Graduates at this level will have knowledge and skills for initial work, community involvement and/or further learning.	Certificate I	0.5 to 1 year
Level 2	Graduates at this level will have knowledge and skills for work in a defined context and/or further learning.	Certificate II	0.5 to 1 year
Level 3	Graduates at this level will have theoretical and practical knowledge and skills for work and/or further learning.	Certificate III	1 to 2 years
Level 4	Graduates at this level will have theoretical and practical knowledge and skills for specialised and/or skilled work and/or further learning.	Certificate IV	0.5 to 2 years
Level 5	Graduates at this level will have specialised knowledge and skills for skilled/paraprofessional work and/or further learning.	Diploma	1 to 2 years
Level 6	Graduates at this level will have broad knowledge and skills for paraprofessional/highly skilled work and/or further learning.	Associate degree; Advanced diploma	2 years; 1.5 to 2 years
Level 7	Graduates at this level will have broad and coherent knowledge and skills for professional work and/or further learning.	Bachelor degree	3 to 4 years
Level 8	Graduates at this level will have advanced knowledge and skills for professional/highly skilled work and/or further learning.	Graduate diploma; Graduate certificate; Bachelor honours degree	0.5 to 1 year; 0.5 to 1 year; 1 year
Level 9	Graduates at this level will have specialised knowledge and skills for research, and/or professional practice and/or further learning.	Masters degree (extended); Masters degree (coursework); Masters degree (research)	3 to 4 years; 1 to 2 years; 1 to 2 years
Level 10	Graduates at this level will have systematic and critical understanding of a complex field of learning and specialised research skills for the advancement of learning and/or for professional practice.	Doctoral degree	3 to 4 years

== Schools sector ==
=== Senior Secondary Certificate of education ===
The Senior Secondary Certificate of Education (SSCE) is the graduation certificate awarded to most students in Australian high schools, and is equivalent to the Advance Placement of North America and the A-Levels of the United Kingdom. Students completing the SSCE are usually aged 16 to 18 and study full-time for three years (years 10, 11 and 12 of schooling). In some states adults may gain the certificate through a Technical and Further Education college or other provider.

The curriculum, assessment and name of the SSCE is different in each state and territory. The government of each determines these themselves, although the curriculum must address mutually agreed national competencies.

State and territory SSCEs
State	SSCE title	Abbreviation
Australian Capital Territory	Australian Capital Territory Year 12 Certificate	ACTE
New South Wales	Higher School Certificate	HSC
Northern Territory	Northern Territory Certificate of Education and Training	NTCET
Queensland	Queensland Certificate of Education	QCE
South Australia	South Australian Certificate of Education	SACE
Tasmania	Tasmanian Certificate of Education	TCE
Victoria	Victorian Certificate of Education	VCE
Victoria	Victorian Pathways Certificate	VPC
Western Australia	Western Australian Certificate of Education	WACE

The Universities Admissions Centre (UAC) generates a nationally standardised final score for each SSCE student called the Australian Tertiary Admission Rank (ATAR). Universities and other Higher Education providers typically use this mark as the main criterion in selecting domestic students. Prior to 2010, this was called the Equivalent National Tertiary Entrance Rank (ENTER) in Victoria, the University Admissions Index (UAI) in New South Wales and the Australian Capital Territory, and the Tertiary Entrance Rank (TER) elsewhere.

Recognised competing qualifications outside the SSCE include the International Baccalaureate (IB). For school leavers, UAC scales a IB Diploma score to a published ATAR rank.

== Vocational Education and Training and Higher Education sectors ==
There has been growing overlap between the Vocational Education and Training (VET), organised under the National Training System, and Higher Education sectors in Australia. Courses are primarily taken by those aged over 18, however in some vocational and general academic courses a minority of students enter at the minimum school-leaving age of 16, although from May 2009 Federal Government policy calls for young people to be in education, gainful employment, or training until age 17 (Year 12 qualification) with tightening of income support payments to age 20 if not undertaking further training. This tends to happen particularly at Technical and Further Education colleges (TAFE), and is less likely to happen at a university or a private institution.

The two sectors form a continuum, with VET at the lower end and Higher Education at the higher. VET courses are typically short, practical in nature and delivered by a TAFE college or registered training organisation at a certificate to diploma level. Higher education courses typically take several years or longer to complete, are academic in nature and are delivered by universities and other higher education providers at diploma, associate degree, degree or higher level. There is significant overlap, however; a TAFE college may offer degrees and universities may offer certificates and diplomas (so called 'dual sector' providers).

There has been a strong push towards mutual recognition of qualifications, with VET or Higher Education courses recognised towards other courses (and for those under 21 towards an SSCE). A process of Recognition of Prior Learning (RPL) has been implemented to allow competencies gained through work and other experience to be assessed and recognised. For instance, a Diploma of Agriculture might be recognised as the equivalent of the first year of the Bachelor of Agricultural Science degree; a unit of Letter Writing in a Certificate IV of Writing might be recognised as a unit towards a Bachelor of Business degree; experience in aged care might be recognised towards a Certificate in Community Services.

All students doing nationally recognised training need to have a Unique Student Identifier (USI).

=== Certificates I–IV ===
Certificates I–IV are the basic qualifications and prepare candidates for both employment and further education and training. There is no firm duration for these qualifications. Entry for Certificate III and Certificate IV courses requires the completion of Year 10/11 education, respectively.

Certificates I–II provide basic vocational skills and knowledge, while Certificates III–IV replace the previous system of trade certificates and provide training in more advanced skills and knowledge. These courses are usually delivered by TAFE colleges, community education centres and registered private training providers.

=== Diploma, advanced diploma, associate degree ===
Courses at diploma, advanced diploma and associate degree level take between one and three years to complete, and are generally considered to be equivalent to one to two years of study at degree level. Depending on how the courses are designed and registered, diplomas may be vocational or higher education, while associate degrees are higher education.

These courses are usually delivered by universities, TAFE colleges, and private registered training organisations and higher education providers.

=== Bachelor degree and honours ===
The bachelor degree is the standard university qualification and is recognised worldwide. Most courses take three to four years to complete and are Level 7 qualifications on the AQF.

Honours may be awarded on top of a bachelor's degree after an additional year of study for three-year degrees. An Honours degree is a Level 8 qualification and is denoted by "Hons" in parentheses following the degree abbreviation, for example BA (Hons). Honours degrees requiring an additional year of study generally involve a research project and require the completion of a thesis during the optional fourth year of study.

Traditionally these courses have almost exclusively been delivered by universities, however there is now a growing number of TAFE institutions and private colleges who have higher education status to deliver degree programs.

=== Graduate certificate and graduate diploma ===
Graduate certificate and graduate diplomas are Level 8 qualifications alongside the Bachelor (Honours) degree. Entry to a graduate certificate or graduate diploma typically requires completion of a bachelor's degree or higher. In some cases, admission may be on the basis of significant work experience. Graduate certificates typically take six months of full-time study to complete, while graduate diplomas typically take twelve months.

=== Masters degree ===
A completed bachelor's degree, sometimes with honours (typically for Master of Philosophy degrees), is a prerequisite for admission. Often there is a minimum grade point average (GPA), weighted average mark (WAM) or honours requirement for admission also. The pattern of study generally takes one of the following three forms:

- Coursework – comprising postgraduate level rigorous academic coursework and project work. In some fields also consists of a research component and requires the completion of a thesis. In such fields, completion of only the coursework component without submitting a thesis usually results in a graduate diploma being awarded instead. These degrees are typically one to two years in duration when studied full-time.
- Research – comprising substantial research and completion of a major, externally assessed thesis. These degrees are typically one to two years in duration when studied full-time.
- Extended – for preparation for professional practice in fields such as law, medicine, physiotherapy, speech pathology, social work or other professional fields. These degrees are typically three to four years in duration when studied full-time.

Master's degree (extended) are permitted to deviate from the 'Master of ...' naming convention. Those in legal practice may use the name Juris Doctor but the qualification does not allow a graduate use of the honorific title 'doctor'. Master's degree (extended) in medical practice, physiotherapy, dentistry, optometry and veterinary practice are allowed to be named 'Doctor of ...' or 'Master of ...', such as Doctor/Master of Dentistry, Doctor/Master of Optometry and Doctor/Master of Medicine, and graduates are permitted to use 'Doctor' (Dr.) as a courtesy title where it is existing practice for that profession. Universities are not permitted to refer to these degrees as doctorates and must note on documentation such as transcripts that the qualification is a master's degree (extended).

Master's level courses are delivered by universities and a limited number of registered private providers.

=== Doctoral degree ===
The highest qualification, a doctoral degree is awarded by a university. This generally requires the completion of a major thesis, which has to be assessed externally by experts in the field of study. Additionally, there are professional doctorates, which require less research and are partially assessed by coursework or projects. Entry into an Australian standard doctorate program usually requires an honours degree with at least class 2A honours or a master's degree with a significant research component. The AQF also permits the awarding of higher doctorates on the basis of an internationally-recognised contribution to the field of study the doctorate is in. Holders of doctoral degrees are permitted to use the title 'Doctor'.

== 2019 Review of the Australian Qualifications Framework ==
A federal review of the AQF reported in 2019, recommending an overhaul of the framework and setting out principles for a future AQF. The report recommended that the new AQF have:

- a less complex structure with a primary focus on the qualification types
- a clearer taxonomy with eight bands of knowledge and six bands of skills
- contemporary definitions of knowledge and skills (Knowledge, Skills and Application to be defined in terms of action)
- a focus on the design of qualifications linked to learning outcomes for individual qualifications
- a revised Pathways Policy to broaden guidelines for credit recognition across AQF qualifications
- a prototype national credit points system for voluntary adoption by institutions and sectors
- a new ongoing governance body to give effect to decisions of the Review of the AQF
- more consistent and effective references from governing agencies

== Qualification issuing agencies ==
While the AQF specifies the standards for qualifications, it is the education and training organisations that issue a qualification. Education and training organisations are authorised to issue qualifications by one of the following authorities.

- State and territory government authorised statutory bodies responsible for issuing the Senior Secondary Certificate of Education in their own state or territory.
- Registered training organisations authorised by the Australian Skills Quality Authority (ASQA) and the government accrediting authorities in Victoria and Western Australia to issue AQF qualifications in vocational education and training.
- Non-self-accrediting higher education providers authorised by the Tertiary Education Quality and Standards Agency (TEQSA) to issue AQF qualifications in higher education.
- Self-accrediting universities and higher education providers authorised by the Tertiary Education Quality and Standards Agency (TEQSA) to issue AQF qualifications in higher education

Other users of the Specifications are industry and professional bodies, licensing and regulatory bodies, students, graduates and employers.

== See also ==
- Tertiary education in Australia
- Technical and Further Education
- Certificate IV in TESOL
