= Special Religious Education in New South Wales, Australia =

Special Religious Education (SRE), aka 'Scripture,' is optional instruction in a particular religious persuasion in New South Wales government schools ie. students attend after being opted-in by their parents or carers. Time is allocated in NSW government schools for qualified SRE volunteers to teach students about their chosen religion.

The NSW Education Acts requires that NSW government schools provide it where requested, but not all schools do. The NSW Department of Education has policies and procedures pertaining to it.

Although SRE has been around since the 19th century, there have been various debates about its place in schools. With increasing debate in the 2000s about it, the Education Act was changed in 2010 to allow alternative Special Education in Ethics classes to run concurrently for children who do to not attend religious education classes.

== Background ==
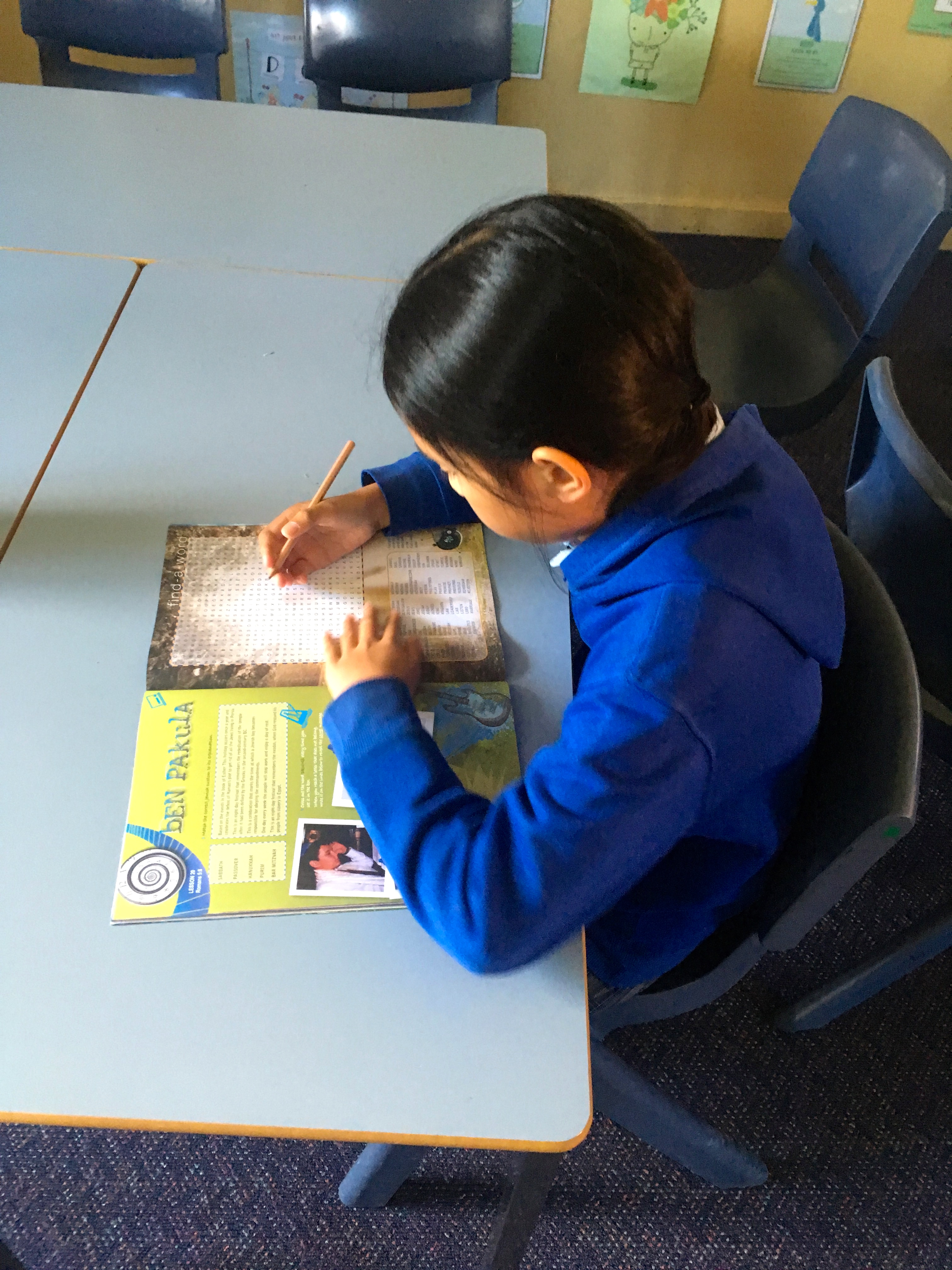
Student working in their SRE scripture workbook

While SRE can include a range of various religious providers for parent's students to choose from, depending on the school community demographic, Christian SRE is the predominant subject provided. Providers are required to be approved by the minister of education on the basis of a fairly simple application form. Providers are responsible for curricula and each is supposed to provide details of their curriculum to the school community; and this is supposed to be available via each school's website. The service of conducting religious education in NSW government schools is not funded by the government, therefore SRE Teachers are either volunteers or religious organisation employees who teach on a particular faith once a week, every two weeks or on occasion depending on the school. The time allocated to the volunteers to teach can vary in each government school from 30 to 45-minute lessons.

=== History ===
A place for SRE was agreed in the lead up to the formalisation of the public school network in the 1870s. Church schools and religious education had been introduced in the 1820s after Sailors settled in Australia. The Church of England was the principal provider of education in early 19th century Australia.

From the 1830s, education was promoted as a system that didn't favour any specific religious denomination. Governor Bourke introduced a school system that had Students of different faiths attending the same school. Religious leaders were given access into the school to teach their congregation. In 1848, the Board of National Education started a new schooling system with the authority of Governor Fitzroy.

In 1866, the Public Schools Act was created to help organise how government and other money would be spent on education and the facilities to best accommodate universal education. In 1872, it was agreed that the government would throughout all the states in Australia stop supporting the religious-based schools financially.

In 1880, the Public Instruction Act included details on religious education in schools. It stated that government schools are required to involve religious teaching and instruction in the students curriculum of learning. It also provided an option for parents to exclude their children from such religious education if they wished. In 1980, the Rawlinson Report came out addressing government schools use of religion in NSW education. It involved references to the Public Instruction Act, and made suggestions for the future of SRE teaching.

In 2011, the government and department recommended that SRE's placement in Schools should be reviewed. As a result, a review on SRE in government schools was conducted from the end of 2015 into 2016. The report of the review was made public in early 2017.

== Rationale ==
The NSW Department of Education outlines the importance of learning religion in government school curriculums but SRE is not comprehensive, general religious education.

The NSW Education Act 1990 No.8 states under Section 32 that "in every government school, time is to be allowed for the religious education of children of any religious persuasion." However "no child at a government school is to be required to receive any general religious education or special religious education if the parent of the child objects to the child's receiving that education".

=== Qualifications ===
SRE Teachers are required to undergo some training before they are allowed to teach Students. They are required to obtain a Working With Children Check from any Service centre in NSW.

=== Providers ===
The NSW government provides a list of groups that are permitted to enter public schools and teach various Religions. Such providers may include local churches or faith-based organisations. There are 101 providers that the NSW Department of Education has approved in providing SRE classes in public schools.

The majority of SRE classes are providers from the Christian faith, which involves 87 out of 101, and the remaining 14 are from seven other faith types. These groups involve Islamic, Hindu, Buddhist, Jewish, Baháʼí, Vedic and Sikh. The main Christian faith groups in order of quantity includes Evangelical, Catholic, Baptist, Anglican and Presbyterian.

In 2015 there were approximately 11,400 approved SRE Teachers, with 3% of them being paid.

==== List of providers ====
- Presbyterian Church of Australia
- Anglican Church of Australia
- Baháʼí
- Independent Baptist
- Buddhist
- Catholic
- Evangelical Churches
- Hindu
- Independent Christian Church
- Islamic
- Jewish
- Lutheran
- Methodist
- Seventh-Day Adventist
- Uniting Church in Australia

== Statistics ==
1. Christian (86.0%)
2. Other faith groups (14.0%)

Different Christian organisations
Catholic	16%
Anglican	7%
Evangelical	16%
Baptist	1%
Independent Baptist	11%
Presbyterian	3%
Other groups	46%

In 2015 a review of SRE in NSW Government schools was conducted. The results showed that 87% of schools were delivering SRE classes, 92% of them being primary and 81% secondary schools.

From the pie graph, the main religious groups being taught in NSW schools in 2015 was Christian based faith groups. The bar graph shows the percentage of each Christian religion taught in government schools.

The 2015 Review of SRE in NSW Government schools showed that the availability of the participation in the main faith groups are due to the location and type of school that is able to offer the religion.

The review also showed the student participation in SRE. In primary schools the participation in 2015 was 71% and the participation of students in secondary schools was 30%.

== Controversies ==
There has been an ongoing debate surrounding SRE on whether it should be happening in schools.

Catherine Byrne, wrote for the ABC in 2010 about SRE providing religious groups with the ability "to use this access privilege to enter public schools and spend an hour each week delivering content that is important to them ... to deliver such instruction so freely, unhindered by government regulation". Additionally, a survey was taken in 2010 stating that "70 percent of parents and educators felt that SRE delivered important lessons in values". The other side of the argument shares that SRE is giving Christianity an advantage, plus parents are concerned with discrimination and segregation.

The CEO of Christian SRE, Murray Norman has argued for continuing to have scripture classes in schools. He has stated it is an opportunity where students can learn about the faith of their parents and which they want their children to grow in, and such faith includes values and morals. Some people have disagreed with Norman's statements. Parents have expressed concerns such as about SRE occupying class time for teaching other, considered-more-important topics.

The NSW Teachers' Federation has said "teachers had concerns about the 'dead time' for students who chose not to attend scripture". Cathy Byrne addresses that the debate on SRE in schools needs to take into consideration all factors of religion being taught and that people need to think about the ways in which we maybe able to improve SRE.

In 2017, The Guardian reporter Christopher Knaus, shared peoples concern about some inappropriate topics such as abortion especially in SRe classes to young children. After the review on SRE in 2015, negative thoughts arose on what particular faith-groups were teaching the students that attended. The same year, Naaman Zhou reported that the NSW Labor Party at the time would be debating policy at their annual state conference on whether to remove scripture classes. The public school community had a high percentage supporting this motion. The Daily Telegraph shared similarly the push of removing scripture classes from schools, as some families weren't seeing the priority of it in their children's education. One parent shared that, "schools should be offering something everyone can benefit from like debating, sport, cooking or dancing".

In 2018, The Sydney Morning Herald stated that secondary principals wanted it removed from the program because it was taking up precious time that they thought should be used on other more important learning for their students. The wish to remove SRE from NSW schools is still ongoing as news reporter stated that teachers were finding it out-dated. SRE providers continue to argue that SRE is essential for a students growth.

While SRE is still currently being provided in NSW government schools, the debate on its place in schools is still ongoing.

== Alternative ==
The Education Act 1990 states that Special Education in Ethics Schools are required to make this other class available to Students whose parents object in sending their Children to an SRE class. can be provided concurrently in the 'scripture' time slot in government schools instead of instruction in a particular faith or students doing 'alternative meaningful activities' of homework, reading, or personal study (which many stage 1 students cannot do without help or supervision).

== See also ==
- Christian views on the classics
- Freedom of education
- Religion and children
- Religious school
- Religious studies
- State religion
- Religious education in primary and secondary education
- Religious Education
