= Early Years Learning Framework =

Australian early childhood curriculum

The Early Years Learning Framework (commonly known as EYLF) is the national curriculum framework for early childhood education in Australia, which commenced in 2009. It provides guidance for educators working with children from birth to five years of age in Australia, including long-day care, family day care, preschool and kindergarten settings. The EYLF outlines the principles, practices and learning outcomes intended to support children's learning, development and wellbeing during their early years.

== Development of EYLF ==
The EYLF was first introduced in 2009, and in 2012 became part of the implementation of Australia's overarching National Quality Framework (NQF) laws, regulations and quality ratings for early childhood education and care. It was developed collaboratively by the Australian and State and Territory Governments with substantial input from the early childhood sector and early childhood academics. The Framework incorporates feedback from an extensive consultation process, including two national symposiums, national public consultation forums, focus groups, an online forum and case-study trials.

The Early Years Learning Framework Professional Learning Program (EYLF PLP), was developed for the Australian Government by Early Childhood Australia in 2009, to provide ongoing professional support to childcare services in the EYLF implementation process. The program was incorporated into the National Quality Standard Professional Learning Program (NQS PLP). The NQS PLP focuses on assistance for services to meet the National Quality Standard.

The Victorian Department of Education and Training adapted the EYLF and in 2016 published the Victorian Early Years Learning and Development Framework (VEYLDF). The VEYLDF has been implemented across Victoria providing a framework for working with children from birth to eight years of age (extending beyond the EYLF) covering the first years of primary school. While the EYLF moved to Version 2 in January 2023 the VEYLDF has no changes and remains in its original form.

In April 2021 the Education Ministers of Australia announced a review and update of the EYLF. The three-phase process concluded in late 2022, with findings and feedback from a range of pilots to inform recommendations for consideration by Education Ministers.

In January 2023 the Australian Education ministers approved proposed changes and endorsed the use of Version 2.0 of the EYLF under the National Quality Framework. Three new principles were introduced including Aboriginal and Torres Strait Islander perspectives, sustainability, and collaborative leadership and teamwork. The original version 1 was revoked from February 2024.

== Description ==
The EYLF consists of three parts that outline the environment that educators in Australia should shape around children:

1. Principles: goals for the care, e.g. "Secure, respectful and reciprocal relationships";
2. Practices: guidelines for how to achieve the goals set out in the principles (includes hands-on examples);
3. Outcomes: a list of 5 overall goals, each with 2-5 sub-goals. Each of those sub-goals has a list of things that the child could have done to meet the overall goal, serving as an easy reference for teachers (see example structure below):

- Learning Outcome 1: Children have a strong sense of identity
- Learning Outcome 2: Children are connected with and contribute to their world
- Learning Outcome 3: Children have a strong sense of wellbeing
- Learning Outcome 4: Children are confident and involved learners
- Learning Outcome 5: Children are effective communicators

== Relationship to the National Quality Framework and National Quality Standard ==
Australia's National Quality Framework (NQF) is the national system for regulating, assessing and improving the quality of early childhood education and care services. Within the NQF, the EYLF provides the national curriculum framework that guides children's learning and development, while the National Quality Standard (NQS) sets the benchmarks against which services are assessed and rated. Together the EYLF and NQS provide a consistent approach to early learning pedagogy, practice and quality assurance across Australia.

== Translations and accessibility ==
The Australian Department of Education has made the EYLF available in over 20 community languages to support accessibility for educators and families from diverse backgrounds.

== See also ==
- National Quality Framework (NQF)
- National Quality Standard (NQS)
- Victorian Early Years Learning and Development Framework (VEYLDF)
- Curricula in early childhood care and education
- Te Whāriki - New Zealand Equivalent of EYLF
