= Australian Flexible Learning Framework =

The Australian Flexible Learning Framework is a national strategy collaboratively funded by the Australian Government and all Australia's states and territories.

It is intended to provide the vocational education and training (VET) system with e-learning skills, professional development opportunities, products, resources and support networks to meet today's increasingly technology-driven learning environment. The Framework has multiple strands, including Toolboxes, New Practices, Benchmarking, Client Engagement, Learnscope (professional development), Networks, and previously Flexible Learning Leaders.

Its aim is to meet the e-learning needs of students and communities, business and industry, Indigenous learners and people with disabilities.

The Framework was governed by the Flexible Learning Advisory Group (FLAG), represented by senior managers from all states and territories. Overseen by COAG.
