= Timothy Grucza =

Australian film director (born 1976)

Timothy Grucza (born 1 July 1976 in Melbourne, Australia) is a cameraman and documentary film maker. He is best known for his work in conflict zones such as Iraq and Afghanistan.

Grucza is the recipient of two Emmy Awards for cinematography.

Grucza is currently based in Brooklyn, New York.

== Career ==
Grucza began his career in Australia, working on issues in the South Pacific including civil unrest in West Papua. In 1999 he documented repatriated Kosovan Australian refugees, who had escaped the war in Kosovo and were granted safe haven in Australia. He began covering Iraq in 2002 when he entered the Kurdish enclave in the north of the country. During the 2003 invasion of Iraq Grucza worked as a correspondent for the French network Canal+. Since then he has worked extensively in Iraq, Israel and the Palestinian territories, Pakistan and Afghanistan for PBS Frontline.

He continues to produce his own films and pieces for Frontline.

== Awards ==
In 2006, along with Yuri Maldavsky, Grucza released his first feature-length documentary film named White Platoon (a.k.a. "La Section White"). The film is a unique look at a platoon of soldiers who spend one year in Baghdad, entering as idealistic young men and leaving as cynical, sometimes bitter, veterans. The film won best Feature Length Documentary at the Banff World Television Festival and was selected for the Hot Docs Canadian international documentary film festival.

In 2009 Grucza was awarded a News and Documentary Emmy for Outstanding Individual Achievement in a Craft: Cinematography for his work on the Frontline documentary, The War Briefing.

== See also ==
- Compagnie des phares et balises
