= Perth Montessori School =

Perth Montessori

Location
- Perth, Western Australia; Australia; 31°57′56″S 115°53′54″E

Information
- Type: Montessori, Independent, non-denominational and co-educational
- Established: 1980
- Principal: Sally Alderton (2022)
- Staff: About 20
- Colour: Purple
- Slogan: Encouraging curious, independent, lifelong learners.
- Website: perthmontessori.com

Perth Montessori is a boutique, independent, co-educational school for children from birth to 18 years. It is located in Burswood, an inner-city suburb of Perth, Western Australia.

== History ==
The school began in 1980 as the Victoria Park Montessori Playgroup, before becoming the Montessori Children's Centre with the opening of the first Children's House, Hibiscus, in 1982. Anne Zekas was the first principal.

In 2000, Gary Pears joined the school as the principal. The centre changed its name to Perth Montessori School and became a registered not-for-profit association. The school first began accepting secondary enrolments in 2007.

== Campus ==
The campus expanded throughout the 1980s and early 1990s, increasing the size of its primary education facilities and obtaining a second property. It expanded further in 2006 acquiring an adjoining property on Burswood Road, which now houses the school reception, offices, cycle 4 and 5 classes and other ancillary teaching areas.

== 2018 Name Change ==
In 2018, the board changed the school's name to Perth Individual. At the annual general meeting held in 2021, school members voted to return to the name Perth Montessori. This transition was completed in July 2022 when the school's registered name returned to Perth Montessori. The school's registered charity name, Perth Montessori School, has remained the same since it was originally established.
