= Queensland Curriculum and Assessment Authority =

State education authority in Queensland, Australia

Authority overview
- Formed: 1 July 2014
- Preceding authority: Queensland Studies Authority
- Jurisdiction: Queensland Government
- Headquarters: Brisbane, Queensland
- Authority executive: Brian Short, Chair
- Parent department: Department of Education
- Website: qcaa.qld.edu.au

The Queensland Curriculum and Assessment Authority (QCAA) is a statutory authority of the Queensland Government responsible for the development and appropriate delivery of kindergarten, primary, and secondary education in Queensland, Australia. The authority itself does not operate any educational institutions, but creates, amends and certifies syllabuses, issues Queensland Certificates of Education, and regulates assessment.

== QCAA Board ==
The QCAA Board is a seven-member caucus of education leaders, and is the governing body for the authority. The board's seven positions are filled by three education sector leaders (each from the state, Catholic, and independent sectors) and four members appointed by the minister for education. The founding Education (Queensland Curriculum and Assessment Authority) Act 2014 explains that the minister can only appoint people "having the qualifications, experience or standing the Minister considers relevant to the functions of the authority."

As of 24 September 2020, the board's seven positions are filled by:

- Brian Short, ministerial appointment (chair)
- Tony Cook, representing the Department of Education
- David Robertson, representing Independent Schools Queensland
- Lee-Anne Perry, representing the Queensland Catholic Education Commission
- Doune Macdonald, ministerial appointment (Note: Macdonald is a specialised appointment, classed under "having relevant corporate, governance or financial qualifications or experience", rather than general experience relevant to the authority.)
- Carol Nicoll, ministerial appointment
- Cresta Richardson, ministerial appointment
