= Training package (Australia) =

A training package is a set of nationally endorsed training standards, qualifications and guidelines in Australia.

A training package is used to recognise and assess the skills and knowledge people need to perform effectively in the workplace. Training packages are developed by Service Skills Organisations or by enterprises to meet the training needs of an industry or group of industries. Training packages prescribe outcomes required by the workplace, not training or education.

A training package contains three compulsory endorsed components:

- Competency standards
- Qualifications framework
- Assessment guidelines

== Competency standards ==
Competency standards are a set of benchmarks used to assess the skills and knowledge that a person must demonstrate in the workplace to be seen as competent. These benchmarks are packaged into combinations to form units of competency.

=== Units of competency ===
Code	Title	Descriptor	Pre-requisite(s)	Application Statement
TAADES401A	Design and develop learning programs			

- Unit code - The unit code contains the three alpha characters identifying the Training Package, followed by alpha and/or numeric characters. It must comply with the length specified in the AVETMIS Standard (no more than 12 characters).
- The Unit Title is a brief statement of the outcome of the unit of competency for example "Design and develop learning programs".
- The Unit descriptor broadly communicates the intent of the unit of competency and the skill area it addresses.
- Prerequisite units are units that should be completed before commencing the unit.
- Unit application statement describes the unit's application within the work place. It indicates the environments in which the skills and knowledge may be applied and sets out the parameters of the unit, its potential audience and its relationship to other units in the Training Package.
- Elements are sub tasks or skills describing the outcomes which contribute to a unit.
- Performance criteria are the levels of performance for each element.

=== Required skills and knowledge ===
Developers need to describe the essential skills and knowledge required for competent performance

- Knowledge: identifies what a person needs to know to perform the work in an informed and effective manner.
- Skills: describes the application of the knowledge to situations where understanding is converted into a workplace outcome. While knowledge must be expressed, units of competency, their elements or performance criteria should not be entirely knowledge based unless a clear and assessable workplace outcome is described. Knowledge in units of competency: should be in context; should only be included if it refers to knowledge actually applied at work; could be referred to in the performance criteria and the range statement.

Essentially the information in this section of the unit of competency is detailing learning outcomes. A learning outcome is a clear and specific statement of what students are expected to learn in a unit and to be able to demonstrate at its completion. Especially when read in conjunction with the Range Statement, which varies and sets out the conditions under which the competencies and skills are performed.

=== Key competencies ===
Key competencies (generic skills) are in every unit of competency. Information on the Key Competencies and the relevant performance level is usually contained in a table in the individual competencies. All competency standards are required to be mapped against the Key Competencies.

The seven key competencies cover:

- Collecting, analysing and organising ideas and information
- Expressing ideas and information
- Planning and organising activities
- Working with others and in teams
- Using mathematical ideas and techniques
- Solving problems
- Using technology.

The key competencies are described at three performance levels.

- Level 1 = the level of competency needed to undertake tasks effectively
- Level 2 = the ability to manage tasks
- Level 3 = concepts of evaluating and reshaping tasks.

An assessment of a unit of competency also includes an assessment of the key competencies.

=== Range statement ===
This sets out the variety of contexts or situations in which performance can take place. For example, does the unit cover 'all diesel, hybrid, and petrol engines' or 'petrol only'.

=== Evidence guide ===
Assists with the interpretation of the unit and may include information on:

- Underpinning knowledge
- Practical skills
- Critical aspects of assessment
- Literacy and numeracy requirements
- Information on the industry requirements.
- Date when the training package was developed.
- Detailed information to assist assessors and those delivering the training.
- Contain advice on units of competency that should be assessed together or that should be completed prior to assessing the unit.

== Qualifications framework ==
All the qualifications for an industry and the Units of Competency required for each qualification make up the Qualification Framework.

== Assessment guidelines ==
Assessment guidelines are a set of requirements used to check that a person's performance meets the Competency Standards. The Assessment Guidelines ensure assessment is Valid, Reliable, Fair and Consistent.

== Organizations working with Training Package ==
The Department of Education and Training controls the Australian Industry and Skills Committee (AISC), which was created in 2015 with the purpose of overseeing the development of training packages and implementing Vocational Educational and Training (VET) Programs Members of AISC become appointed by state ministers of labor and skill and are selected because for their knowledge and experience within a particular industry.

Additional support for the development, adaptation and implementation of training packages is given to the AISC by Service Skills Organizations (SSO). There are a total of six SSO’s obtaining funding from the Australian government and they are tasked with providing the AISC with unbiased information collected from major industry employers and educational training sectors. SSO’s include: Artibus Innovation, Australian Industry Standards, IBSA Manufacturing, PWC Skills for Australia, Skills Impact and Skills IQ.

== Training Package Development ==
In order to create a training package there must first be an industry backing the need to change the current system of training employees in hopes of improving the aptitude of employees for the workforce. The process of developing and endorsing training programs requires that a forecast predicting future skill requirements, as well as a breakdown of how altering training packages would fit into the schedule of training developments likely to take place in the nation over the next four years, are made.

One way that SSOs achieve this is through the assemblage of Industry Reference Committees (IRC). IRCs are conglomerates of experienced individuals from a given industry who assemble to collaborate about the ways training packages increase the applicability of job trainings to the workforce. As long as the programs created meet the requisite units for competency, Innovation and Business Skills of Australia (IBSA) standards and do not overlap with any repeating requirements or courses, the AISC is able to implement the program into its schedule of future training packages.

Other ways that data can be gathered is through filling out a request on the Australian Governments site for education and training, but this can only be executed by large employers seeking government help. Once implemented the SSO’s use their relations with the IRCs to promote the use of VETs in the industrial sectors the committees represent.

== Training package database ==
The Department of Education maintains a searchable database of Training Packages and is the "official national register of information on Training Packages, Qualifications, Courses, Units of Competency and Registered Training Organisations".
