= National Quality Standard =

Standards for early childhood education quality in Australia

The National Quality Standard (or NQS) is the national benchmark for the quality of early childhood education and care, and outside school hours care services in Australia. It is part of the National Quality Framework (NQF) which provides a consistent approach to regulation, assessment and improvement of education and care services across Australia.

== Aim ==
The National Quality Standard aims to promote:

- the safety, health and wellbeing of children
- a focus on achieving outcomes for children through high-quality educational programs
- families' understanding of what distinguishes a quality service.

== Quality Areas ==
The NQS outlines seven quality areas, each containing standards and elements, that children's education and care services are assessed and rated against.

The seven quality areas covered by the National Quality Standard are:

- QA 1 - Educational program and practice
- QA 2 - Children's health and safety
- QA 3 - Physical environment
- QA 4 - Staffing arrangements
- QA 5 - Relationships with children
- QA 6 - Collaborative partnerships with families and communities
- QA 7 - Leadership and service management

Under the NQF, services are assessed and rated by their state or territory regulatory authority against these quality areas and given both individual ratings for each area and an overall quality rating.

== Role within the National Quality Framework ==
The NQS is one of the core components of the NQF, which also includes the Education and Care Services National law and regulations, approved learning frameworks (such as the Early Years Learning Framework) and the assessment and quality rating process.

== Assessment and ratings ==
Under the NQF, regulatory authorities conduct assessments of approved education and care services against the criteria. Services receive ratings that reflect their performance in each of the quality areas. These ratings are published to provide transparency.

== See also ==
- National Quality Framework (NQF)
- Early Years Learning Framework (EYLF)
