= Unique Student Identifier =

Australian student identification number

Unique Student Identifier logo

Unique Student Identifier (USI) is a unique educational reference number issued by the Australian Government to all higher education students (including universities, TAFEs and independent tertiary colleges) for the purpose of collecting information about a student's training and study activity, and their movements within the VET and higher education systems in Australia.

The Unique Student Identifier is for life and is a requirement for all higher education students studying in Australia to obtain one. Both domestic and international students are included in the scheme, and the USI is independent of a University ID number as it is managed on a nationwide scale.

== History ==
The concept of a national student registrar was first officially suggested by then Education Minister, Julia Gillard in 2010. It was proposed to be linked to the My School website for primary and high school students to keep track of their academic records. However, the proposal faced strong backlash from the opposition and public, mainly due to privacy reasons.

In April 2012, the Council of Australian Governments (COAG) decided to implement the USI nationally to give VET students access to a complete record of their VET enrolments and achievements to better track their learning, even if they move between institutions for different courses. The government seeks this information to provide an important foundation for improving the performance of VET and higher education system and better meet the needs of students, education providers and employers. After discussions between state and federal leaders followed by consultations with stakeholders, Commonwealth legislation was passed and the USI Registry System commenced in January 2015. The first issued USI was required to apply or enrol in any nationally registered VET courses.

In December 2019, the Australian Government introduced the Student Identifiers Amendment (Higher Education) Bill 2019 into Parliament, which seeks to amend the Student Identifiers Act 2014 to extend the use of USI to all higher education students. From January 2021, new domestic and onshore international higher education students may apply for a USI. In January 2023, USI becomes mandatory, where higher education providers must not confer an award on an individual without a USI unless an exemption applies. Although the USI is now used throughout tertiary education, there is still strong advocacy for the identifier to extend its use to primary and high schools to combat the drop in school attendance rates.

Key legislations that involves the implementation of the USI include:

- Student Identifiers Act 2014
- Standards for Registered Training Organisations (RTO) 2015
- Student Identifiers Regulation 2014
- Student Identifiers (VET Admission Bodies) Instrument 2015
- Student Identifiers (Exemptions) Instrument 2018

== Application ==
From 2023, it is a requirement for all higher education students in Australia to obtain a Unique Student Identifier.

A USI is needed if an individual is:

- A new or continuing domestic student undertaking nationally recognised training
- A higher education student in a Commonwealth Supported Place (CSP) or graduating in 2023 and beyond
- An international student studying in Australia for any part of their course

The only exception is if the individual has been granted an exemption, is an international student completing all of their studies outside of Australia, or if an Australian student is studying overseas and is not with an Australian education provider.

A USI is essential to receive a statement of attainment, qualification, or an award. It is also a must when applying for higher education support such as HECS-HELP, FEE-HELP and Research Training Program (RTP) funding.

The USI also gives VET students an online record of their nationally recognised training in the form of a VET transcript. This can be used when they are applying for a job, seeking a credit transfer, or as proof of prerequisites when undertaking further training. The USI will stay with the student for life. All students will need to provide their USI while enrolling in any higher education courses. For students who are unable to create one, some training organisations are able to create a USI for students with their permission.

== Format ==
The USI is a randomly generated alphanumeric 9-digit alphanumeric code with an additional check digit. As is the case with many identification numbers, the USI includes a check digit for detecting erroneous numbers. However, the algorithm is undisclosed due to security reasons and is only available on request to education and training providers.

== See also ==
- Education in Australia
