= Registered training organisation =

Australian organisation approved to deliver nationally recognised training

A registered training organisation (RTO), in Australia, is an organisation providing Vocational Education and Training (VET) courses to students, resulting in qualifications or statements of attainment that are recognised and accepted by industry and other educational institutions throughout Australia.

== Australia-wide ==
There are almost 5,000 RTOs in Australia, providing training across a wide range of subject areas including traditional trades, advanced technical training, para-professional and professional studies, as well as pre-employment and basic skills programs.

RTOs may be government (state or territory) or privately owned organisations. All RTOs in Australia and the qualifications they are registered to deliver are listed on the training.gov.au website, a national register that replaced the National Training Information Service (NTIS) in 2011.

To become registered as an RTO, an organisation must apply to the regulatory body in the jurisdiction it falls. Depending on the organisation's main location and the student cohorts to whom it intends to provide training and assessment services, its regulatory body will be:

- the Australian Skills Quality Authority (ASQA)
- the Victorian Registration and Qualifications Authority (VRQA), or
- the Training and Accreditation Council of Western Australia (TACWA).

== Australian Skills Quality Authority ==
The Australian Skills Quality Authority (ASQA) is the regulatory body for RTOs in:

- Australian Capital Territory
- New South Wales
- Northern Territory
- South Australia
- Tasmania, and
- RTOs in Victoria and Western Australia that offer courses to overseas students, and/or offer courses to students in states other than Victoria or Western Australia, including online courses.

To become registered to deliver Vocational Education and Training in any state or territory outside of Western Australia and Victoria, or to overseas students, an organisation must meet a range of mandatory requirements, including:

- compliance with all components of the Vocational Education and Training (VET) Quality Framework (VQF), which replaced the Australian Quality Training Framework (AQTF) for ASQA-regulated RTOs on 1 January 2012
- cooperation with ASQA's compliance monitoring activities and directions, and
- payment of fees and charges associated with registration.

Organisations must also meet additional requirements when:

- seeking registration on the Commonwealth Register of Institutions and Courses for Overseas Students (CRICOS) to offer courses to overseas students, or
- offering VET courses with additional licensing requirements

=== Vocational Education and Training (VET) Quality Framework ===
Organisations registered under ASQA's jurisdiction must comply with the requirements of the VET Quality Framework (VQF), which has the following components:

1. The Standards for Registered Training Organisations (RTOs) 2015, which came into effect for new RTOs on 1 January 2015 and for existing RTOs on 1 April 2015. All RTOs within Australia that fall under the jurisdiction of ASQA must comply with the standards at all times as a condition of their registration.
2. The Financial Viability Risk Assessment Requirements 2011. These requirements are designed to ensure that organisations generate sufficient income to meet operating expenses while delivering quality training and assessment services.
3. The Data Provision Requirements 2012. Periodically, RTOs must submit data compliant with the Australian Vocational Education and Training Management Information Statistical Standard (AVETMISS). This includes information about students, their courses and qualifications completed, and provides the mechanism for national reporting about the VET system.
4. The Australian Qualifications Framework (AQF) is a national policy for regulated qualifications within the Australian education and training system, including VET and higher education. It provides learning outcomes for each level and qualification type, in a taxonomic structure designed to enable consistency in the way in which qualifications are described as well as clarity about the differences and relationships between qualification types.

== Victorian Registration and Qualifications Authority (VRQA) ==
To apply for registration as an RTO with the VRQA, an organisation must have its principal place of business within Victoria, and only deliver VET to students within Victoria or Western Australia. Organisations must be able to demonstrate compliance with:

1. The principal purpose requirement. From 1 January 2012, the legal entity of an applicant for registration must have the principal purpose of providing education and training.
2. The VRQA Guidelines for VET Providers.
3. Requirements under the Australian Quality Training Framework (AQTF). The AQTF is a set of standards to assure nationally consistent, quality training and assessment services within Australia's VET system.

== Training and Accreditation Council (TAC) of Western Australia ==
Within Western Australia, TAC will only accept applications from organisations that deliver and assess within Western Australia and Victoria only, and that have their head office located in Western Australia.

Organisations must demonstrate a thorough working knowledge of the Australian VET system and comply with:

1. The Australian Quality Training Framework (AQTF) Essential Conditions and Standards for Initial Registration.
2. The Vocational Education and Training Act 1996.
3. Other relevant state and Commonwealth legislation and licensing requirements.
4. All policies for RTOs issued by TAC.

== Maintaining registration ==
To maintain national registration, ASQA-regulated RTOs must continue to comply with the VET Quality Framework as well as any further conditions that may have been imposed by ASQA.

To ensure compliance with these obligations, ASQA conducts two types of audits:

1. Registration audits, conducted on receipt of an application for initial registration as an RTO, or in some cases on renewal of registration or when applying to change scope of registration.
2. Compliance audits, conducted within two years of initial registration or if it has been determined that there is a risk that the RTO will fail to comply with relevant standards.

To maintain registration, TAC- and VRQA-regulated RTOs must continue to comply with relevant standards. Quality audits are conducted:

1. When initiated by clients: at initial registration, renewal of registration and when amending scope.
2. When initiated by TAC or VRQA: within 12 months of initial registration, in response to complaints, to monitor compliance and when strategic industry audits are required.

== See also ==
- Technical and Further Education
- Vocational Education and Training in Australia
- Education in Australia
