= Early Childhood Australia =

- Formation: 1938
- Legal status: active
- Headquarters: Canberra, Australia
- CEO: Samantha Page
- Patron: David Hurley
- Key people: First President Ada Mary a'Beckett
- Website: www.earlychildhoodaustralia.org.au

Early Childhood Australia is an early childhood advocacy organisation in Australia, acting in the interests of young children, their families and those in the early childhood education and care field. Its chief executive officer is Samantha Page. In 2020, it advocated for increased subsidies for early childhood education in response to cuts in the federal Child Care Subsidy. It also supports JobKeeper benefits for day care workers. Early Childhood Australia was established, as a result of medical practitioner Vera Scantlebury Brown's reports on infant welfare.
