= Victorian Early Years Learning and Development Framework =

Early childhood curriculum in Victoria, Australia

The Victorian Early Years Learning and Development Framework (VEYLDF) is a state-wide, curriculum for early childhood education implemented in Victoria, Australia, for working with children from birth to eight years of age to support literacy, numeracy, health and wellbeing.

The VEYLDF was released in 2009 by the Department of Education and Training (Victoria) having been adapted from the Early Years Learning Framework (EYLF) for Australia, and implemented during 2010. A key difference between the two frameworks include how EYLF focuses on children from birth to five years of age, while VEYLDF extends to eight years. Both frameworks share the same five learning and development outcomes, with the VEYLDF linking to the first three year levels of the Victorian curriculum F-10 (Foundation - year 10). While the EYLF moved to Version 2 in January 2023 the VEYLDF has no changes and remains in its original form.
