= Languages Other Than English =

LOTE or Languages Other Than English is a term often used in education for languages besides English in Australian jurisdictions, such as NSW, Queensland, Tasmania, and Victoria; and American jurisdictions, such as California, New York, and Texas. Students who speak languages other than English at home are known as student with Language Backgrounds Other Than English (LBOTE), of which students with English as an Additional Language or Dialect (EAL/D) are a subset, i.e. those needing additional support to access the curriculum and develop the academic English language proficiency required for success in school.

The name evolved from 'heritage language', a term first used to refer to languages other than French and English in Canada. The term was later modified in relation to the Australian context to refer to languages other than English. US researchers and policy-makers adopted this adapted Australian version in subsequent years. LOTEs have often historically been related to the policy of multiculturalism, and tend to reflect the predominant non-English languages spoken in a school's local area.

== Heritage languages ==
=== LOTE acquisition ===
The home environment plays a significant role for acquisition of multilingualism in early childhood development. In a study, researchers found a positive relationship between parents who valued and spent time developing their child's literacy skills and their child's language proficiency. Parents who expose their child to libraries, picture books, reading aloud, storytelling, playing games, and rhymes improved literary and language skills. Such environmental factors impact progression of home languages. Lexical development, the changes in vocabulary over childhood, is a key area for bilingualism. Lexical acquisition holds two major components: the amount and context of language input and the application of this input.

=== LOTE maintenance ===
The maintenance of a second, minority language is greatly impacted by parental language input patterns at home. Often, children in bilingual circumstances will prioritize the majority language, English in this case, while the minority language varies according to households. One study suggest that the likelihood of bilingual maintenance can be increased if the majority language is restricted at home. This could come in the form of one parent speaking one language. This would improve the minority language input. Another study found that the female caregiver has the most influence on a child's communication at home. They saw that if the female primarily used a LOTE, then the child's minority language proficiency was greater.

The maintenance of a home language is significant to some ethnic families as a form of cultural identity continuation and intergenerational family relationships, especially with grandparents. Maintenance of a LOTE is perceived to also provide greater economic opportunities in the future. However, home language maintenance and loss are quite dependent on family context. Another research found that many parents were worried that bilingualism would confuse their child. For example, a bilingual child may intermix majority and minority languages to form sentences. This has been subjected to differing opinions. One side argues that language confusion causes language delay, whereas the opposing view suggest that code-switching, the intermixture of two languages, is an indication of mastery of the two languages.

A literature review found another parental motivation for teaching a minority language is for their child to be a language broker. Language brokers are children who translate and interpret the majority language for their families. This typically occurs when parents do not understand the dominant language. The language brokers skills are typically utilized for official documentations, such as government forms, bank statements, applications, and insurance. In one study the brokers outperformed native English speakers as their literacy exposure was beyond a typical school setting. The study concluded that the unique role has shown greater cognition and problem-solving abilities as the language broker would reason at an adult-level real-world context. These situations naturally improved the broker's skills in developing literacy as children as young as 12 years old were translating linguistically challenging official documents and meditating conversations. This role places greater responsibility on the child which potentially helps them mature more quickly as they interact in more adult situations. Language brokers often can help bridge the cultural gaps between their family and the new community.

Social and educational environments also contribute to language maintenance or loss. One study found that the use of minority languages typically declines; however, the minority language, Spanish in this instance, improved when a teacher taught bilingually, despite minimal knowledge of Spanish. Students would typically converse in Spanish for non-academic conversations and smaller group settings. The study concluded that sociolinguistic environments strongly maintain and develop native languages. In a separate study, children who attended bilingual preschools had greater language proficiency in English and Spanish, their minority language. It suggests that learning English does not hinder the development of a child's native language. Another study found a positive correlation between tight family cohesion and a child's use of their native language.

=== LOTE loss ===
The child's decision to speak a LOTE is a significant factor to the loss of a minority language. For instance, some children internally desire relationships outside of the family. Consequently, English would be primarily used to integrate into society. One study found that children with siblings would often speak English over a LOTE language in conversation.

External influences also influence the continuation and loss of LOTE. For instance, an external force might be schools teaching English as a mandatory subject. Consequently, families may transition to speaking English at home to prepare a child for the dominant language at childcare centres and school. Furthermore, one study found that teachers who did not receive training for heritage languages were more likely to have indifferent or negative attitudes towards LOTE maintenance. They saw that the responsibility of LOTE was for language teachers. The study concluded that all educators need to understand the significance of LOTE for students.

The loss of LOTE can form greater communication barriers between second-third generation children and their grandparents. One study found that the language transition to English is occurring much more quickly as a LOTE can be loss within a generation. This can negatively impact one's sense of heritage, cultural and familial belonging.

== LOTE in Australia ==
=== Australia's LOTE context ===
While Australia has no official national language, English is spoken by the majority of the population, with 72.7% speaking it at home in 2016. The Australian government encourages migrants to learn English in order to integrate into society. English is also the primary language used in Australian schools.

Despite this Australia holds more than 270 ancestries. Australia's cultural diversity lies in its high first-second generation population. In 2016, 67% of Australians were born in Australia while 49% were born overseas, or one or both parents were born overseas.

Between 2011 and 2016, Mandarin home speakers have increased from 1.6% to 2.5%, making it the second most spoken language at home in Australia. Across every state Mandarin was the second most spoken language to English, except the Northern Territory where Australian Indigenous Language was greater. Chinese immigrants have also increased from 1.5% to 2.2% between 2011 and 2016. In 2016, over 300 unique languages were spoken at home, and 21% of Australians spoke another language than English at home. Of individuals born overseas 61% live in New South Wales or Victoria and between 1996 and 2016, Queensland and Western Australia have increased from 9.5% to 16.5% and 9.3% to 12.9%, respectively.

=== Education ===
==== Education declarations ====
During the 1980s and 1990s the National Board of Employment Education and Training became more involved in Australia's curriculum. Three declarations had a significant impact on Australia's education policies and stances. In 1989, the Australian Education Council (AEC) released The Hobart Declaration on Schooling, as a first in a series to unify Australian schooling. The Hobart Declaration asserted that Australian students would encounter, study, and develop a LOTE. Binaco comments the motivation for this was partly economical and that the Hobart Declaration also first introduced economist into the discussions. The Adelaide Declaration on National Goals for Schooling in the Twenty-first Century was produced in 1999 by the Ministerial Council on Education, Employment, Training and Youth Affairs (MCEETYA). The Adelaide Declaration formed languages as a Key Learning Area due to the belief that cultural and linguistic diversity is valuable. In 2008, MCEETYA released the Melbourne Declaration of Educational Goals for Young Australians. The Melbourne Declaration attempts to set Australia's education direction for the next ten years. The Melbourne Declaration inserted ‘especially Asian languages’ in parentheses after languages as a learning area.

==== Tiering system ====
LOTE is becoming an increasingly popular subject in Australian Schools. The Draft Shape of the Australian Curriculum: Languages, produced by ACARA, has suggested three tiers of languages to be taught in Australian schools in 2011:

Tier 1	Tier 2	Tier 3
Italian	Japanese	Arabic
Chinese	French	Modern Greek
	Indonesian	Vietnamese
	Korean	Tamil
	Hindi	
	Bengali	
	German	
	Spanish	

Tier 1 languages were chosen because they cater for the needs of the greatest number of students. Italian is learnt by the most students and Chinese is a national priority.

Tier 2 languages were chosen because French, Japanese, Indonesian and German are some of the most frequently taught languages in Australian schools, Indonesian, Japanese and Korean are national priorities and Spanish "is a language of global importance".

Tier 3 languages were chosen because Tamil, Modern Greek and Vietnamese are the most frequently spoken foreign languages in Australian homes, and Arabic "is a language of global importance".

==== Victorian School of Languages ====
===== History =====
The Victorian School of Languages (VSL) was created in 1935 as a Saturday school that taught Japanese and Italian to students interested and highly academic. VSL was formed due to a small core group of teachers and administrators and financially supported from other benefactors. VSL mainly taught staff's interest and locally available resources as opposed to a formal, summative assessment system. By 1965, enrolments increased for VSL and Dutch, Russian, Indonesian, and Chinese were offered, and the Education department would also financially support all VSL's cost. Furthermore, completion of Japanese and Italian would formally be recognized towards one's high school certificate, and by 1950 Dutch would also be recognized. By 1981, VSL would offer 26 languages, 17 of which was introduced by 1975. This surge was attributed to the influx of two million European migrants during the post-war period due to ethnic groups lobbying the government for additional heritage language classes. However, VSL's audience largely extends past heritage language learners. French, German, and Latin are primarily enrolled by students in schools where these languages are unavailable. In 2014, VSL taught over 7000 primary students, 6500 secondary students in over 40 sites.

===== VSL and mainstream schooling =====
The accreditation of VSL's education offers flexibility to some schools. The Victorian education department's decision to accredit VSL also validates its quality for parents and schoolteachers who might otherwise doubt its value. VSL frees up the compulsory study of LOTE in years 7-8 by having students complete their studies after school hours. Such an option is also available for senior students who desire to reduce their workload by offsetting it to after school hours. However, the Victorian government has processes to allow other institutions to become accredited with the Victorian Certificate of Education (VCE). Thus, while VSL's professionalism and standard meets VCE standards, it is not unique in its educational quality.

Due to VSL's recognition for VCE, the education department requires all VSL teachers to hold, as a minimum, a provisional teacher registration. Teachers are required to progress towards full registration, but the minimum is set due to the scarce number of heritage language teachers who are qualified. The education department does subsidize the attendance to training sessions. Furthermore, the recognition of VSL means that the classes held at mainstream schools have access to technology. One study found that institutions that rent school campuses were not granted access to their facilities. With the increasing role of technology in education VSL's ability to access school facilities enables teachers to be better equipped to teaching HLs.

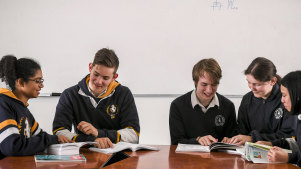
Box Hill High School language students comparing notes on Mandarin and German

However, VSL is not without its challenges. Due to the pluricentric nature of language decisions must be made about which variation is prioritized and taught. This poses political considerations because VSL is a state accredited institution and different ethnic communities, and groups may be affected depending on the variations taught. Furthermore, one study asserts that language, religion, and cultural identity are closely related. This poses a tension between the secularization of education as well as ethnic communities’ views and expectations of teaching HLs. Another study, in Athens, found that some parents responded positively to the inclusion of religious practices as core values for heritage language learners’ cultural identity. Many religious groups offer language classes as an evangelization strategy, where the Melbourne Chinese Christian Church is a notable example with a many Chinese schools linked to the church.

=== Culture ===
Some local government councils across New South Wales acknowledge different heritages by running ethnic festivals. These events attract locals to celebrate diverse cultural identities in the local communities. For instance, in 2016, the Fairfield local council hosted a Moon Festival, or Mid-Autumn Festival, in Cabramatta. This celebrated Cabramatta's high Chinese and Vietnamese population. The festival included traditional activities and performances such as dragon dancing, ethnic foods, moon cake.
