= Indooroopilly State High School =

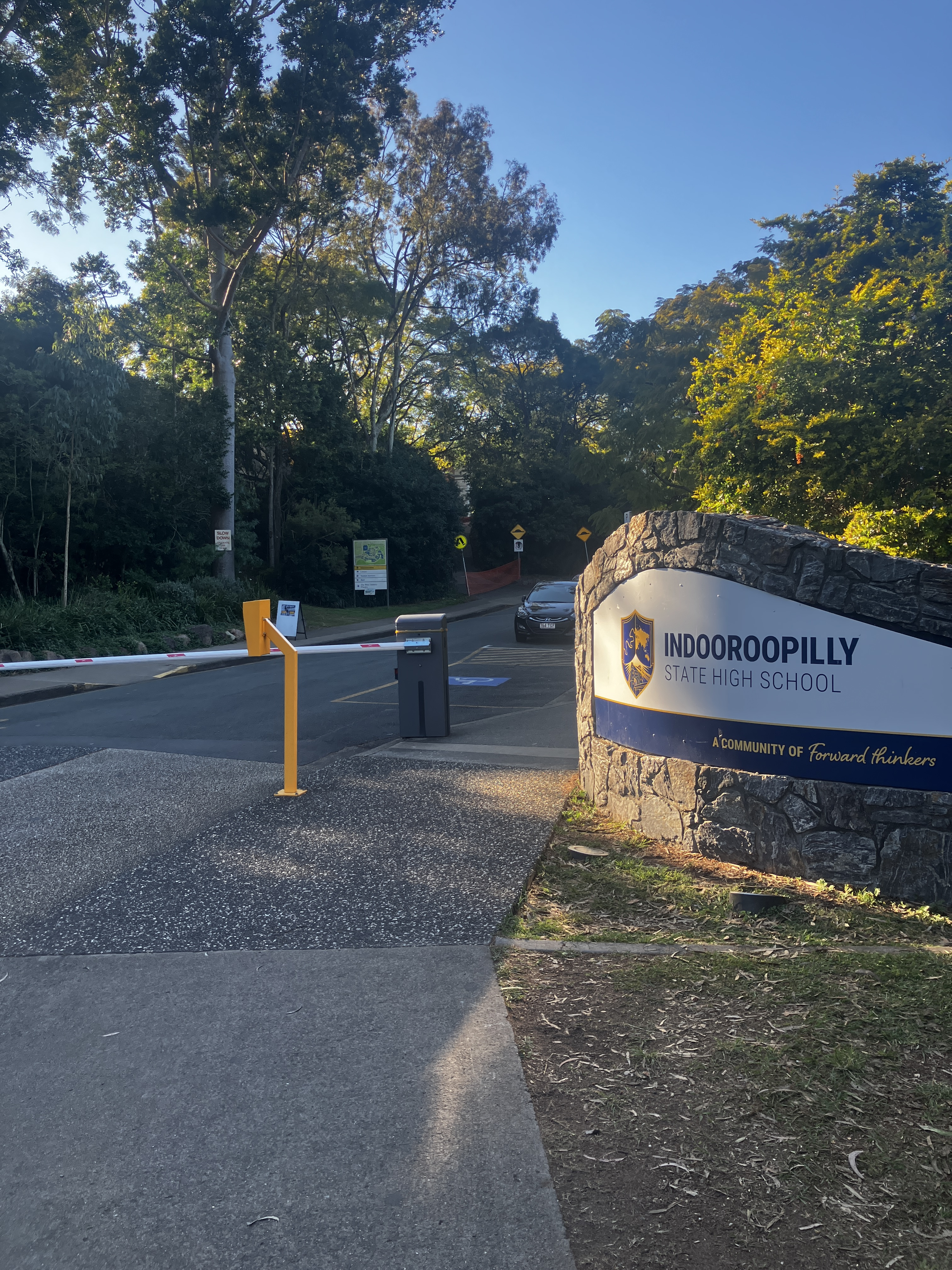
- Ward Street Entrance of Indooroopilly State High School, Brisbane, Queensland, Australia

Location
- Brisbane, Queensland, 4068; Australia; 27.5009°S 152.9851°E

Information
- Type: Public
- Motto: A Community Of Forward Thinkers
- Established: 1954
- Principal: Sheena Millar
- Grades: 7 - 12
- Enrolment: 3913 (2026)
- Capacity: 4000
- Campus: Indooroopilly
- Houses: Lawson, Evans, Kendall, Paterson
- Color
- Nobel laureates: Peter C. Doherty
- Website: https://indoorooshs.eq.edu.au

Indooroopilly State High School (ISHS), colloquially known as "Indro", is a state high school situated in the south-western suburb of Indooroopilly in Brisbane, Queensland, Australia. The school was founded in 1954, and offers both the standard QCAA curriculum, as well as the International Baccalaureate Diploma Programme,

Although the school is the only public state school in Queensland to be non-uniform, it has various sporting and extracurricular uniforms which students are worn during interschool sports events and external events and arts productions.

Some of the Indooroopilly State High School Buildings are listed on the Queensland Heritage Register.

== Facilities ==
The school is made up of 24 different blocks. They are named in letter form in the order in which they were built. The letters range from A to Z, with the exception of 'O'. Some of the facilities at the school include:

- Confucius institute Classroom
- Dance and Art studios with a pottery kiln and film developing room
- Flight Simulator
- Student Centre
- Underground Bunker
- Performance and Lecture Theatre
- Science and Cisco Networking laboratories
- Video conferencing center
- A new school tuck shop (X Block)
- The Multi-Purpose Hall (MPH, W Block), the MPH houses one of the biggest LCD screens in a school setting, 3 sport courts, sport tracking cameras and much more. The hall has many uses but its main purpose is to allow the school to host all schools assemblies, which have previously not been possible due to the high number of students at the school.
- The recent state-of-the-art Innovation and Design Centre (V Block) - featuring 74 tertiary-style learning spaces, including a broadcast-quality Film and Multimedia Production Studio, and Engineering, Robotics, Design, STEM, Science and Aerospace Labs, outdoor learning spaces, eating areas, amphitheater, lockable power outlets for student's laptop charging, courtyard, and secure undercover bike, scooter and skateboard storage.

== Curriculum ==
Like all other state high schools in Queensland, ISHS adheres to Australian curriculum standards set by the Australian Curriculum, Assessment and Reporting Authority (ACARA). Senior high school students may graduate with a Queensland Certificate of Education or an International Baccalaureate Diploma. Various VET courses are also offered.

ISHS also offers some Programs of Excellence which are not available under standard curriculum, including Spanish Immersion, Chinese Acceleration, Music Acceleration and Maths and Engineering Acceleration.

== Culture ==
Cultural practice is promoted by the school as a central part of the learning environment. The school has many celebrations and festivals throughout the school year, which include art exhibitions, concerts, dance productions, drama productions and a musical. One significant festival that is held every year is United Nations Day, where ISHS encourages its student body to celebrate the diversity of the community's cultural or ethnic backgrounds, be it through the wearing of traditional national dress, or on stage performances. The celebrations are initiated with an opening ceremony, during which the Parade of Nations takes place. The parade consists of flag bearers and traditional dress costumes and is usually summed up with a form of cultural dance. International food stalls also play a large part in these UN day celebrations. Overall, ISHS has a multicultural community with approximately 43% of the school's population being international students.

Several major assemblies are held in the MPH and generally require whole-school attendance, these including NAIDOC Week, ANZAC Day and Remembrance Day. A whole-school assembly was summoned in 2022 to farewell Ms Lois O'Reilley, as she retired from her 20-year tenure as Executive Principal. Student clubs are prevalent, such as Indooroopilly Voices (the choir), SRC (Student Representative Council) and Writers' Society.

== 2021 COVID Scare ==
During the COVID-19 pandemic, a student at the school returned a positive test result to COVID-19. As the student had been attending the school for a two day period while infectious, an immediate closure of the school was required. The closure was to last a minimum of two days so a deep clean could be performed. The Queensland Department of Education had initially said they expected the school would re-open after the deep clean was performed, however later backtracked, establishing the school as a COVID-19 exposure site. In light of this, all staff and students present at the site at the same time the symptomatic student was in attendance was required to self-isolate for a 14-day period and undertake a COVID-19 Test in accordance with state health policy. During this period the school switched over to online learning and implemented an online learning policy where students interacted with teachers through via digital platforms. Due to the high volume of people requiring testing, the school oval was converted into a temporary drive-through COVID-19 Testing site.

== 70th Anniversary Celebrations ==
On 11 October 2025, the school held celebrations for the 70th anniversary of its founding. During this event, overseen by then principal Michael Hornby, the graduating class of 1954 was invited to return, as well as the rest of the school's alumni. A time capsule was sealed, containing memorabilia, such as the SRC Constitution, to be opened on the 100th anniversary in 2054.

== Notable alumni ==
- Dane Bird-Smith, athlete who represented Australia and won a Bronze medal in the 20 kilometres race walk in the 2016 Summer Olympics.
- Peter C. Doherty, medical researcher, Nobel Laureate 1996, Australian of the Year 1997.
- Katherine Feeney, radio presenter
- Peter Greste, Al Jazeera journalist and former Indooroopilly State High school captain.
- George Negus, author, journalist and host of Network Ten's current affairs programme 6PM with George Negus.
- Chloe Shorten, journalist and wife of Bill Shorten.
- Jillian Whiting, Brisbane news reader and television host.
- Barry Gomersall, Australian rugby league referee who refereed six rugby league internationals and nine State of Origin series matches.

== See also ==
- Queensland State High Schools
