= Year 7 =

Educational year group

Year 7 is an educational year group in schools in many countries including England, Wales, Australia and New Zealand. It is the seventh full year (or eighth in Australia and England) of compulsory education and is roughly equivalent to grade 6 in the United States and Canada (or to grade 7 for the Australian Year 7). Children in this year are between 11 and 12.

== Australia ==
In Australia, Year 7 is the seventh year of compulsory education and the first year of secondary school (high school). Children entering are generally aged from 12 to 13, and leave around 17 to 18 years old. Students will experience more teachers, usually a teacher per subject, in contrast to the fewer number of teachers they had throughout the year in primary school. Subjects in Year 7 include English; Mathematics; Science; Creative Arts; Humanities and Social Sciences; Languages; Personal development, Health and Physical education; and technologies.

Year 7s will also experience their 3rd and 2nd last NAPLAN tests in March.

The school year is still divided into 2 semesters, with each semester having 2 terms consisting of 10 weeks each. The school day follows the normal work day of 5 days.

=== English ===
In New South Wales, the NSW Education Standards Authority (NESA) lays out that Year 7 students should be able to respond and compose texts for the purpose of understanding, interpretation, analysis, expression and/or pleasure; use a range of skills, strategies and knowledge for their response or composition of texts; shape creativitly different meanings; find links between and among texts; show understanding of how texts showcase aspects of the world; identify and consider cultural expressions in texts; and assess and reflect on their skills they use for learning.

== New Zealand ==
In New Zealand, Year 7 is the seventh year of compulsory education. Children entering Year 7 are generally aged between 10½ and 12. Year 7 pupils are educated in full primary schools, intermediate schools, and in some areas area schools or combined intermediate and secondary schools.

== United Kingdom ==
=== England and Wales ===
In schools in England and Wales, Year 7 is the seventh full year of compulsory education after Reception, with children being aged between 11 and 12. It is the first year group in Key Stage 3 in which the Secondary National Curriculum is taught and marks the beginning of secondary education.

Year 7 follows Year 6, the last year of primary school education.

Year 7 is usually the first year of secondary school. In some areas of England, Year 7 is the third of four or the last of four years of middle school.

=== Northern Ireland and Scotland ===
In Northern Ireland and Scotland, the seventh year of compulsory education is called Primary 7, and pupils generally start at the age of 10–11.

Preceded by Year 6	Year 7; 11–12; 12–13	Succeeded by Year 8
