= Education in Queensland =

Education in Queensland is the responsibility of the Department of Education. The Queensland school system is based around Queensland state schools, independent schools and catholic schools. Schooling in Queensland begins with a preparatory year (Prep) followed by 12 years of study. Primary schools teach Prep through to Year 6, while high school or secondary school is from Year 7 to 12. Prep became compulsory in 2017, and is a full-time program.

Upon completion of 13 years of schooling, students receive a Queensland Certificate of Education and an Australian Tertiary Admission Rank used for tertiary education entrance.

My School provides information about individual schools in Australia. Many schools are finding it difficult to fill teacher vacancies. In recent year Queensland has seen an increase in home schooling enrolments. The state has seven distance education schools.

TAFE Queensland is the statutory authority parent body for TAFE technical and further education training in Queensland. Queensland has eight main universities and two satellite universities across a total of 31 campuses.

== History ==
The first school in Queensland opened in 1826. It provided education for the children of convicts from the first settlement in Moreton Bay. In 1860 the Education Act was enacted. It placed all primary education under one general and comprehensive system controlled by the Board of General Education. Under the Act, education in Queensland is free, secular and compulsory.

Warwick East State School, established in September 1850, is the oldest surviving primary school in Queensland. The oldest surviving secondary school in Queensland is Ipswich Grammar School.

== See also ==
- Education in Australia
- List of schools in Queensland
