= Queensland Teachers' Union =

QTU
- Queensland Teachers' Union of Employees
- Founded: 1889; 137 years ago
- Headquarters: Brisbane, Queensland
- Location: Australia
- Members: 50,000
- Affiliations: AEU
- Website: qtu.asn.au

The Queensland Teachers' Union is an Australian trade union with a membership of more than 50,000 teachers and principals in the Queensland Government's primary schools, secondary schools, special schools, senior colleges, TAFE colleges and other educational facilities. More than 96 per cent of eligible teachers are members. As well as protecting the rights and conditions of its members, the QTU also sees the promotion of public education as a major part of its role.

== History of the QTU ==
The Queensland Teachers' Union was formed in January 1889, when seven regional teachers' organisations gathered at the School of Arts in Brisbane. Anthony St Ledger, the secretary of the East Moreton Teachers' Association, was a driving force behind the union's establishment and became its first honorary secretary. The QTU is the oldest teachers' union in Australia and one of the oldest trade unions of any type in Queensland. In 1895, the QTU published the first issue of the Queensland Education Journal, later renamed the Queensland Teachers' Journal, which is now the oldest continuous teachers' journal in Australia.

With the Public Service Association, the QTU lead the campaign for the establishment of a state public service superannuation scheme for Queensland, which eventually came into being in 1913.

In May 1917, the QTU was granted registration as an industrial association in Queensland's new Arbitration Court, and in November of that year the Queensland Teachers Award became the first agreed in industrial arbitration processes anywhere in Australasia, and one of the first negotiated in an industrial tribunal anywhere.

In 1967, the Industrial Commission granted the QTU's application for equal pay for women teachers, something for which the union had been campaigning since 1919.

The Remote Area Incentive Scheme, which tackles teacher shortages in the state's rural and remote areas by using incentives to attract and retain teachers, was introduced in 1990, after 16 years of QTU campaigning.

== Recent activity ==
In 2010 the QTU, along with other Australian teacher unions, campaigned against the federal government's My School website, which publishes the NAPLAN test performance of schools and provides comparisons between schools.

In 2009, QTU members staged a national strike, the union's first in nine years, in support of a campaign for a salary increase.

In 2008, QTU members in remote areas of Queensland took strike action over what they regarded as the poor standard of housing supplied by The Department of Education and Training.

In 2015, the QTU established in collaboration with the Independent Education Union of Australia QLD branch, the working group "Teachers For Refugees and Asylum Seekers". This working group was established after the forced removal of Yeronga State High Year 12 student Mojgan Shamslispoor to an immigration detention centre in Darwin.

From 2020 until 2022, Kevin Bates was president of the union.

== Structure ==
All members have access to a QTU Union Rep, their first point of contact with the Union. They are serving teachers elected by their colleagues to represent the Union in the workplace.

All members also have access to a Union sub-branch and branch. The QTU has 99 branches, which cover every state school within their boundaries, as well as 30 TAFE branches. Each branch has two representatives on its local area council. There are 11 area councils across Queensland.

QTU State Council (which meets five times a year, except Conference years) and the QTU Biennial Conference (which meets once every two years) are the supreme decision-making bodies of the Union. Each branch and area council is represented.

The QTU Executive manages union affairs between State Council meetings. It consists of 13 serving teachers elected by State Council and the union's senior officers: the President, vice-president, Honorary Vice-president, General Secretary and two Deputy General Secretaries.

The President, vice-president and Honorary Vice-president are elected by the members. They preside at meetings of Executive, Council and Conference and must implement their decisions. They also handle media and community relations. The General Secretary and the two Deputy General Secretaries are elected by State Council and have primary responsibility for the day-to-day administration of the Union.

The Union's headquarters are at Milton in Brisbane, and it has regional offices in Cairns, the Gold Coast, Maryborough, Rockhampton, the Sunshine Coast, Toowoomba and Townsville. The QTU has 12 regional organisers based around the state.

== Affiliations ==
The QTU is not affiliated with any political party, nor does it donate funds to any political parties. Under the QTU Constitution, political party affiliation could only occur after a referendum of all members. However, the QTU does reserve the right to support/oppose candidates (before and during election campaigns), depending on their attitude and actions in relation to QTU policy positions - in particular on public education and industrial relations. The QTU is affiliated with the Australian Education Union, as well as the Australian Council of Trade Unions and the Queensland Council of Unions, the peak Australian and Queensland union bodies.
