= Deep clean =

Deep clean or deep cleaning may refer to:

- Deep clean (COVID-19), a sanitation technology
- Deep Cleaning, an episode of Superstore (season 6)
- Scaling and root planing, also known as deep cleaning

== See also ==
- Domestic deep cleaning
- Commercial cleaning
- Floor cleaning
- Terminal cleaning
