= Anthony St Ledger =

English-born Australian politician

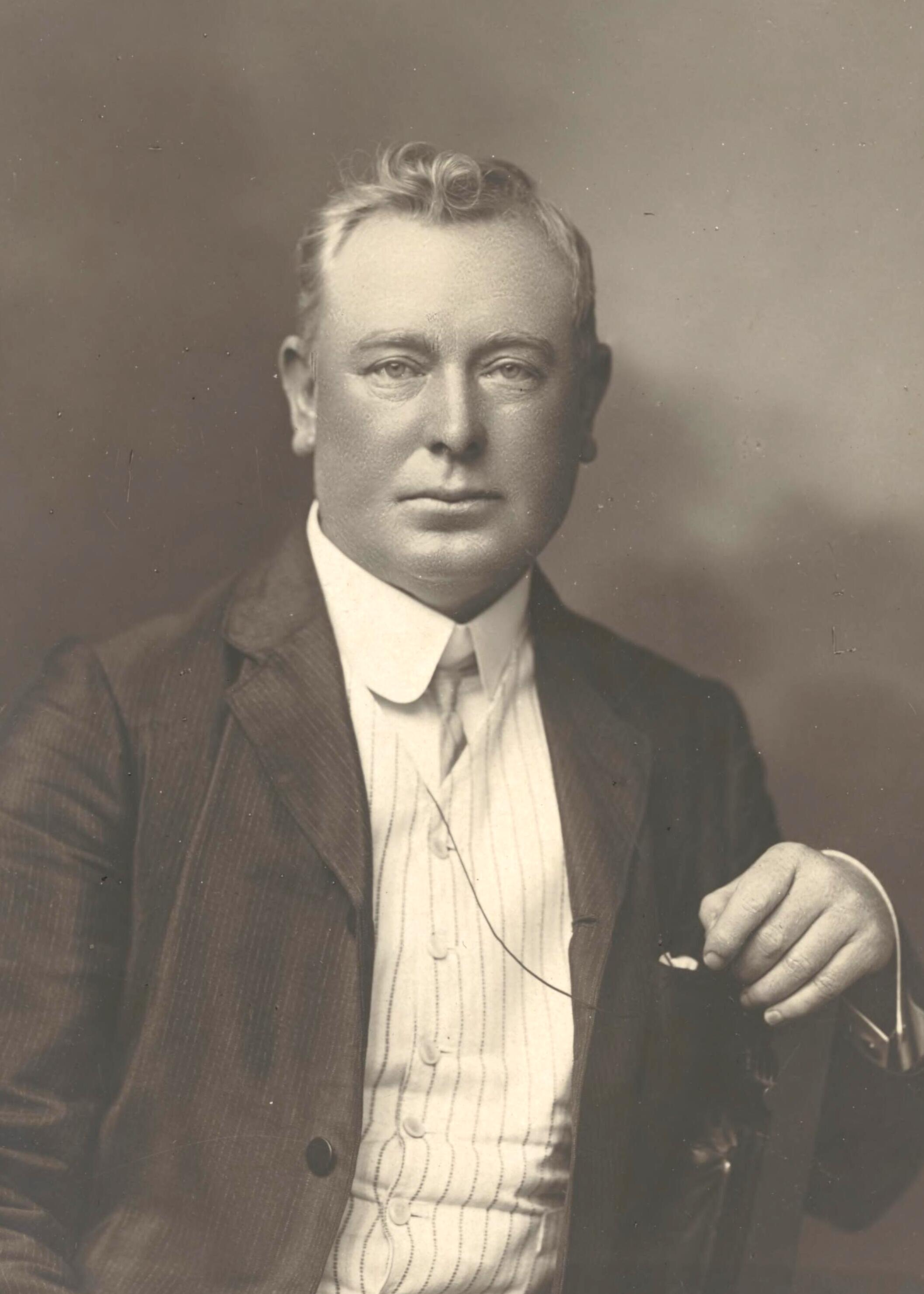
- St Ledger c. 1900

Senator for Queensland
- In office 1 January 1907 – 30 June 1913

Personal details
- Born: 18 February 1859 Barnsley, England
- Died: 17 April 1929 (aged 70) Armadale, Victoria, Australia
- Party: Anti-Socialist (to 1909); Liberal (from 1909)
- Spouse: Mary Baker (m. 1893)
- Occupation: Schoolteacher; Barrister

Anthony James Joseph St Ledger (18 February 1859 – 17 April 1929) was an Australian politician, barrister and educational reformer. He was a senator for Queensland from 1907 to 1913, representing the Anti-Socialist Party and Liberal Party. He was the founding secretary of the Queensland Teachers' Union.

== Early life ==
St Ledger was born on 18 February 1859 in Barnsley, Yorkshire, England. He was the son of Martha (née Waddington) and Michael St Ledger. His father, from an Irish Catholic family, was employed as a sawyer at the time of his birth.

St Ledger and his family arrived in the colony of Queensland in 1861. He attended St Mary's Boys' School, Ipswich, and St Kilian's College, South Brisbane. In 1874, aged 15, St Ledger joined the Queensland Education Department as a pupil-teacher. He taught at Catholic schools from 1875 to 1879 before returning to the state school system. In 1885, St Ledger joined the Brisbane Central Boys' School as assistant headmaster to Bully Kerr. In the same year he began reading law under Frederick Swanwick. He resigned from the Education Department in 1889 to practise law and was called to the bar in 1891.

== Public life and activism ==
In 1887, St Ledger became the founding secretary of the East Moreton Teachers' Association, one of Queensland's first teacher's unions. The following year he appeared before the newly established civil service commission and publicly criticised the Education Department and its officials, including John Gerard Anderson. He encouraged the formation of similar regional associations and helped establish the first conference of the Queensland Teachers' Union in January 1889, serving as honorary secretary in January 1889.

== Politics ==
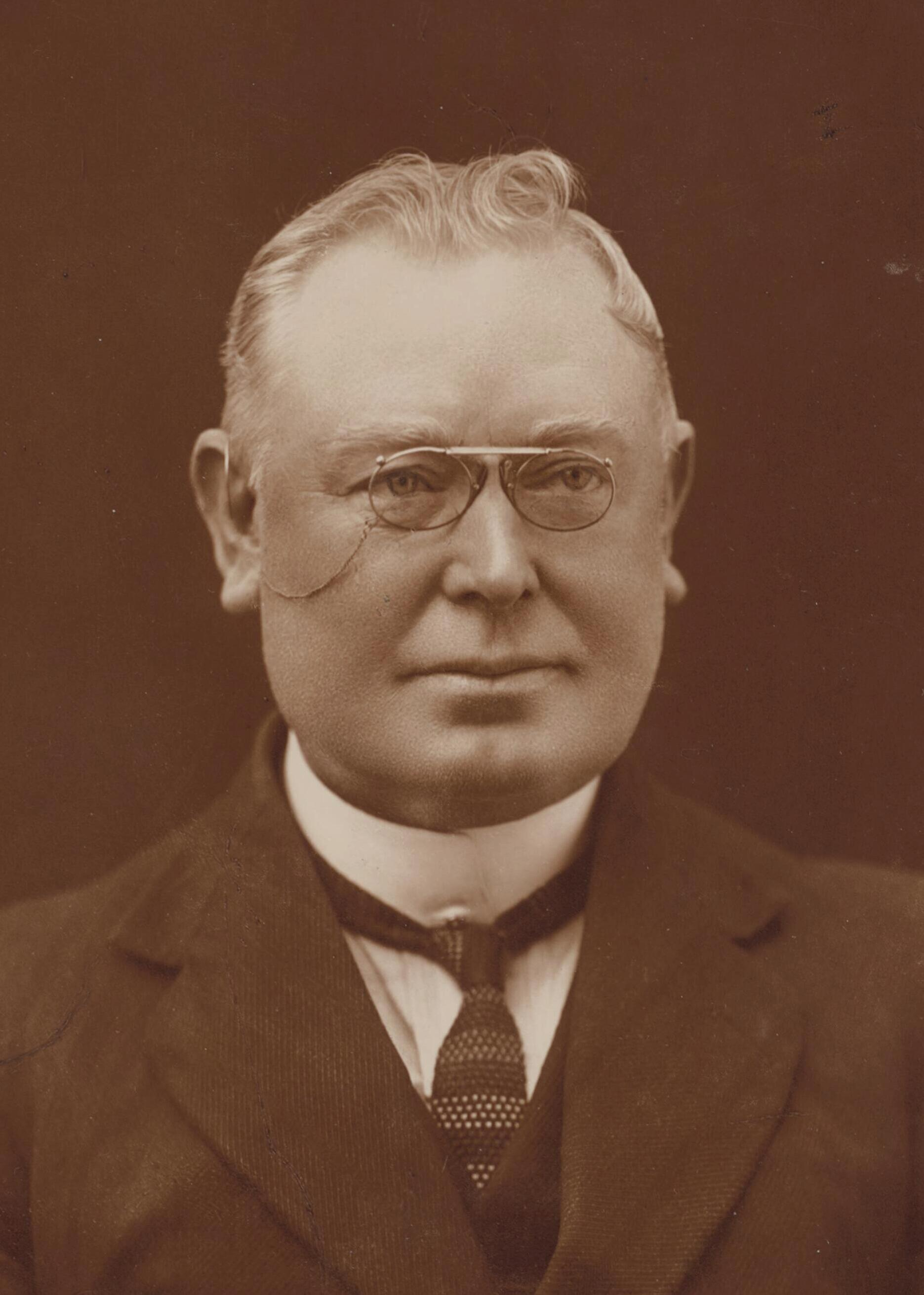
Photograph by Swiss Studios

St Ledger was elected to the Senate at the 1906 federal election, winning a six-year term commencing on 1 January 1907 (later extended by six months pursuant to a constitutional amendment). He was elected on a ticket as one of three candidates endorsed by the Queensland Central Anti-Socialistic Council, alongside Thomas Chataway Robert Sayers. He joined the Anti-Socialist Party in parliament.

St Ledger served on the Standing Orders Committee from 1907 to 1913. In parliament he was known as an articulate speaker, with the Brisbane Courier praising "his eloquence and his diction" and Melbourne's Punch stating "is no debate so wearisome but Senator St Ledger will find something new to say, and say it at the greatest possible length". Although he had occasionally criticised Prime Minister Alfred Deakin, St Ledger following the rest of the Anti-Socialist Party into the new Deakin-led Liberal Party in 1909. He was defeated for re-election at the 1913 federal election with his term ending on 30 June 1913. He remained in Melbourne after his defeat and returned to his legal practice.

=== Political views ===
St Ledger was "a stern critic of all forms of socialism". He was a leading parliamentary critic of the Australian Labor Party (ALP) and opposed what he viewed as the socialistic policies of compulsory arbitration and state-owned enterprises. In 1909 he published Australian Socialism: An Historical Sketch of its Origin & Developments, an anti-socialist tract. His second book Federation or Unification? Some Problems of the Australian Commonwealth and their Solution contained "a pungent criticism of what he perceived as the unconstitutional growth of Commonwealth power over that of the states".

Despite his earlier advocacy of teachers' unions, St Ledger became increasingly critical of the labour movement. He used parliamentary questions to compile statistics on trade unions and the Commonwealth Court of Conciliation and Arbitration. In 1911 he stated that industrial arbitration had failed in Australia and that governments should return to previous methods of dealing with strikes and industrial action.

== Personal life ==
In 1893, St Ledger married Mary Helena Baker, with whom he had four children. He was a foundation member of the Queensland Irish Association and served on its committee for the commemorations of the Irish Rebellion of 1798.

St Ledger died on 17 April 1929 at his home in Armadale, Victoria.
