= Indooroopilly State High School Buildings =

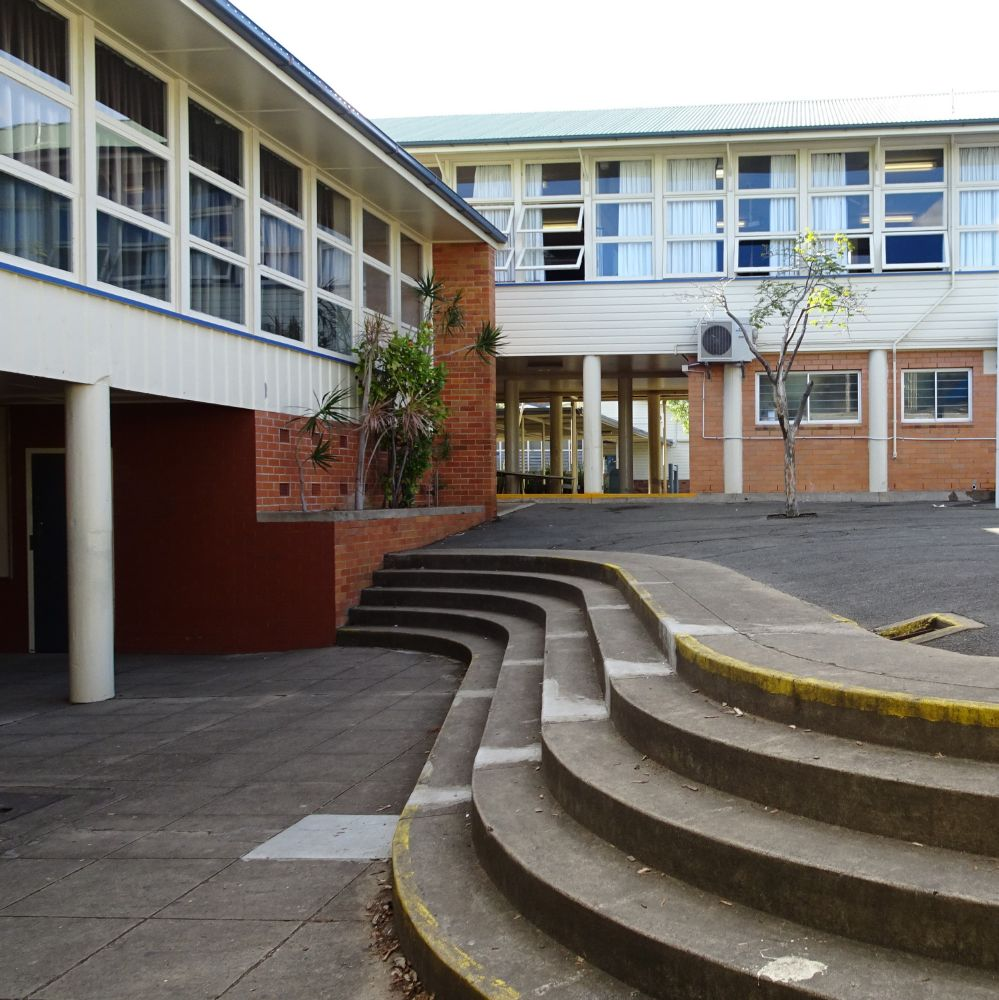
- View of Parade Ground between blocks A and C, 2016

- Location within Queensland
- 27.5012°S 152.9851°E
- Location: Ward Street, Indooroopilly, City of Brisbane, Queensland, Australia

History
- Design period: 1940s–1960s (Post-WWII)
- Built: 1953–1963

Site notes
- Architect(s): Boulton & Paul Ltd; Department of Public Works (Queensland)

Queensland Heritage Register
- Official name: Indooroopilly State High School
- Type: state heritage
- Designated: 14 October 2016
- Reference no.: 650035
- Type: Education, Research, Scientific Facility: School – state (high)
- Theme: Educating Queenslanders: Providing secondary education

Indooroopilly State High School Buildings is a heritage-listed collection of buildings at Indooroopilly State High School at Ward Street, Indooroopilly, City of Brisbane, Queensland, Australia. It was designed by Boulton & Paul Ltd, Department of Public Works (Queensland) and built from 1953 to 1963. It was added to the Queensland Heritage Register on 14 October 2016.

== History ==
Indooroopilly State High School (SHS) opened in early 1954 in response to post-World War II (WWII) population growth in Brisbane's suburbs and the growing demand for secondary education. As of 2025, Indooroopilly SHS retains its original complex of seven timber and brick buildings constructed during 1953–59:

- A Block (1953–54)
- B Block (1954)
- C Block (1954–55)
- Building A6 (1955)
- D Block (1957–58)
- E Block (1958–59)
- G Block (1958–59)

These buildings are constructed from a range of standard materials and structural methods employed by the Department of Public Works (DPW) during the 1950s, including: prefabricated Boulton & Paul timber units (blocks A and B); timber trusses (blocks A and C); and steel open-web trusses (blocks D and E). The buildings also feature differences in roof form, glazing, and verandah and stair arrangements that illustrate changes to standard school building types throughout the late-1950s. The school retains its organic 1950s site planning of long classroom blocks positioned in response to existing and man-made contours, spiralling around a high point in the centre of the steeply-sloping site. Blocks are connected by covered areas and walkways, and landscape elements include brick planter boxes, concrete stairs and pavements, a bitumen parade ground and roadways, retaining walls, gardens, mature trees, and sporting facilities such as a c. 1959 oval and mid-1960s basketball and tennis courts. The school has been in continuous operation since its establishment.

The suburb of Indooroopilly is located 7 kilometres (4.3 mi) southwest of the Brisbane CBD. Although the Indooroopilly area was surveyed as farm allotments in 1858, central Indooroopilly did not attract agricultural settlement to the same extent as nearby Fig Tree Pocket, St Lucia and Long Pocket; and its development was limited until the Brisbane to Ipswich railway line opened to the locality in 1875. In the late 19th century a small township developed near the Indooroopilly railway station, and a number of large villas were erected on the banks of the Brisbane River. By the 1920s further subdivision had created a busy suburb, and growth was also facilitated by the opening of the Walter Taylor Road Bridge)in 1936. Indooroopilly's population (including Taringa) rose from 1029 in 1911, to 2048 in 1921, and 8565 by 1947.

Early schools near Indooroopilly included Toowong Mixed School (opened 1870, now Ironside State School, St Lucia) and Indooroopilly State School, opened in 1889. The establishment of schools was considered an essential step in the development of early communities and integral to their success. The State Education Act 1875 provided for free, compulsory and secular primary education and established the Department of Public Instruction. Schools became a community focus, a symbol of progress, and a source of pride, with enduring connections formed with past pupils, parents, and teachers.

After WWII, Indooroopilly was chosen as the site for a new state high school. In Queensland, governments were slow to establish state secondary education, considering it to be of little relevance to Queensland's primary industry-based economy. It was not until 1912 that the government instituted a high school system, whereby separate high schools were established in major towns or, where the student population was too small, a primary school was expanded to include a "high top". In Queensland generally, high schools remained few in number until after WWII, when secondary education was generally accepted as essential and was more widely provided for.

In 1954 it was reported that high school enrolments in Queensland had more than doubled since 1948, from 4500 to nearly 11,000. The Department of Public Instruction was largely unprepared for the enormous demand for state education that began in the late 1940s and continued well into the 1960s. This was a nationwide occurrence resulting from immigration and the unprecedented population growth now termed the "baby boom". Queensland schools were faced with enormous overcrowding and a lack of resources because the Queensland Government and community saw education as a low priority and provided the department with only a small budget. The overriding concern for the Department of Public Instruction was the need to build school buildings as expeditiously and economically as possible.

The Queensland Government had a long-standing practice of developing standard plans for its school buildings, which helped ensure consistency and economy throughout the state. From the 1860s until the 1960s, Queensland school buildings were predominantly timber-framed, and standard designs were continually refined in response to changing needs and educational philosophy. Queensland school buildings were particularly innovative in climate control, lighting, and ventilation. In the post-WWII period, the pressures of material shortages and rapid population growth forced the DPW to experiment with prefabrication and new, more efficient structural systems in order to keep up with demand for additional school buildings.

In an attempt to relieve the pressure on the existing state high schools in central Brisbane, which did not have sufficient room to expand, a decision was made in 1950 to establish three new suburban high schools, which would commence with an initial intake of Year 9 pupils and grow over four years. Reflecting the growth of suburbanisation and a move towards a decentralised population in urban centres, new high schools were located in suburban areas rather than the centre of town. This allowed for large grounds with ample room for sports facilities. The general classroom buildings were the same standard types as used for primary schools but high schools also included purpose-built facilities such as science laboratories, domestic science buildings, workshops for woodwork and metal work, libraries, and gymnasiums. These were also built to standard plans but were specific to their use and not a continuation of previous designs.

There was also a focus on the fit between the school and its neighbourhood, as well as site planning for expansion. In the early 1950s, architects developed master planning concepts that influenced the design and layout of the whole school. Initially, these plans were broadly based on regular and symmetrical plan forms around a central or prominent axis. A few years later there was a shift away from grid-like layouts to organic layouts which provided for growth and change. Classroom wings were connected to and fanned away from a central nucleus. Master planning schemes were focussed on the ideal solar orientation of buildings as well as their relationship to the natural contours and existing vegetation, resulting in building layouts that were more asymmetrical and open. The long, narrow buildings were positioned so that the spaces captured between them created playground areas and courtyards.

Indooroopilly SHS was one of the three high schools planned to open in Brisbane in 1954, each with room for 250 students. The suburb of Indooroopilly was chosen so that the school could service the western suburbs, with Banyo State High School servicing the northern suburbs and Salisbury State High School the southeast suburbs, thus reducing the number of secondary pupils travelling to and from the city area. Each school would have room for sports fields, and the buildings would be of brick and timber, with spacious well-lit classrooms, modern furniture, and provision for science laboratories, commercial rooms and libraries.

By May 1950 the Department of Public Instruction had identified a satisfactory site for establishing a high school at Indooroopilly. At that time, Indooroopilly was growing rapidly, with house building extending towards St Lucia. Housing expansion towards and within St Lucia was a result of the relocation of University of Queensland to that suburb. The proposed school site, which eventually encompassed 29.7 acres (12.0 ha), was situated on high ground at the eastern edge of Indooroopilly's suburban development, and was "handy to St Lucia Fiveways and Indooroopilly railway station". In 1950, a Reserve for School Purposes was surveyed, initially of 21 acres (8.5 ha), 2 roods 20 perches (2,500 m^{2}), later becoming 25 acres (10 ha) 1 rood 34 perches (1,900 m^{2}). The Reserve at this time did not include the allotments to the west which later became part of the school oval. St Peter's Lutheran College had opened on 25 February 1945to the south of the Indooroopilly SHS site. A mixture of bush and scrub at the northern end, and low lying, cleared land traversed by a creek at the south end, it included parts of farm portions 38, 39 and 42, originally granted to Thomas Lodge Murray Prior. A pre-1936 farmhouse (which was retained by Indooroopilly SHS until at least 1969) stood at the centre of the site, accessed by driveways from Lambert Road to the south and McCaul Street to the north.

The various land parcels needed to form the high school reserve were acquired by the Department of Public Instruction by early 1951. The northern part of the school site - part of Portion 38, consisting of 4.8 hectares (12 acres) - located south of McCaul Street and between Turner and Magor Streets, was resumed for school purposes by a proclamation dated 22 February 1951. This land passed through the ownership of WH Wilson, GL Hart, and WM Ludwig, before becoming part of the school. The southern part of the school site, located north of Lambert Road and between Carnarvon Road and Magor Street, absorbed Turner Street (unformed) to the south of Ward Street, plus four land parcels. The largest of these, 3.5 hectares (8.6 acres) of land which included parts of portions 38 and 39, was resumed for the school by the February 1951 proclamation. Prior to becoming part of the school this land passed through the ownership of WH Wilson, EM Long, W Robertson and WH Hart, W Robertson, S Donaldson, L Jones, and EI Lovell. Simon Donaldson, dairyman, owned the southern part of the school from 1911 to 1936, and he may have built the farmhouse. Another 1.6 hectares (4.0 acres) was also added to the southeast corner of the school grounds. This land was acquired from Lovell by the Commonwealth in 1949 for the Council for Scientific and Industrial Research (CSIR), and was transferred to the Crown in 1956. It was later part of 10.3 hectares (25 acres) granted to the Queensland Department of Education in 2003. Two small buildings on this land, not present in 1936, were present in 1948 and 1951 aerial photographs, but were gone by 1955. In addition, a small parcel of 0.03 hectares (0.074 acres) near Lambert Road was resumed for the school by the February 1951 proclamation. This small parcel was east of the former Turner Street road reserve, and had not been sold by WH Wilson when he sold off the rest of Portion 38 from 1878 to 1884. The site of the western half of the later school oval, 1.7 hectares (4.2 acres) of land that was formerly resubdivisions 487–527 of Portions 38, 39 and 42A (a road reserve), was purchased by the Secretary of Public Instruction in January 1951. This land had passed through the ownership of WH Wilson, GL Hart, JA Rice and the Brisbane City Council (from 1947). The entire school site became Lot 323, SP253758 (12ha) in 2012. This part of the school grounds already possessed a concrete cricket pitch by 1936, which was later replaced by the school oval. The concrete cricket pitch is recorded on the DNRM Survey Plan SL2586 (sheets 1–3). "Sketch Plan, Indooroopilly State High School", April 1954.

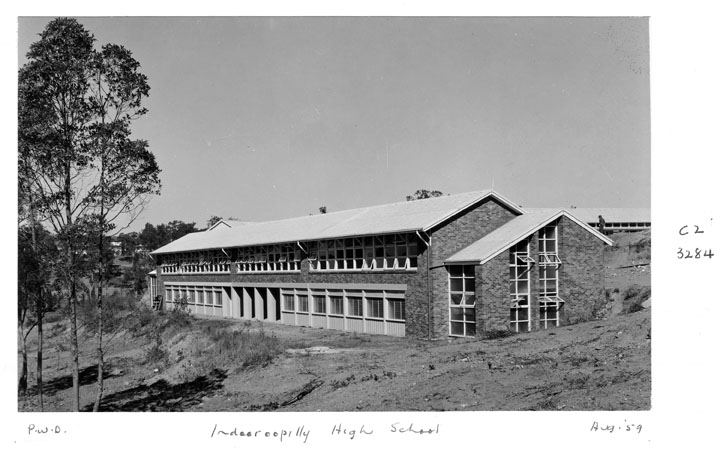
Indooroopilly State High School, 1959

The request to commence construction of Indooroopilly State High School was given in July 1953 by the Director General of the Department of Public Instruction (Herbert George Watkin) to the Under Secretary of Public Works. Expenditure of £26,494 for the erection of the first section of the school was announced in September 1953, and clearing work at the site began in October 1953.

Indooroopilly SHS opened on 2 February 1954, with one classroom building (known as Block A as of 2025), erected on high ground near the centre of the site. The opening enrolment consisted of 167 Year 9 students. The building itself combined structural systems and materials typically used for school buildings at that time. The upper floor of the block was constructed from prefabricated Boulton & Paul timber units, while the ground floor structure comprised DPW-designed timber floor trusses at the western end and brick walls at the eastern end.

Responding to materials shortages and population pressures post-WWII, the DPW imported a British building system from manufacturers Boulton & Paul Ltd of Norwich, England. Based on an 8-foot (2.4 m) planning and construction module, the prefabricated elements in the Boulton & Paul system included ceiling panels, roof trusses, banks of awning windows, and 4-foot (1.2 m) wide wall panels. The buildings were constructed at many schools across Queensland between 1951 and 1958. Timber framed and clad, they had a verandah as circulation and a gable roof. Ideally, they were oriented so the verandah faced north and the classrooms faced south. The stairs and verandah ends were often semi-enclosed with glazed screens. The building could be lowset or highset and had extensive areas of timber framed awning windows, providing more glazing than had ever been used in Queensland classrooms. The classrooms were 24 by 24 feet (7.3 m × 7.3 m), larger than most previous classrooms. The flexibility of the Boulton & Paul system meant that the number of classrooms per block could vary in number to suit the needs of a particular school, and classrooms could also be used to extend existing blocks or form part of new blocks in combination with other structural systems.

From the early 1950s the Department of Public Instruction introduced and developed new standard plans for school buildings, which were similar in form and layout to the Boulton & Paul buildings but not prefabricated: long, narrow, timber-framed buildings with a gable roof, north facing verandah with posts that extended from ground level to roof line, semi-enclosed stairs, and extensive areas of glazing to the verandah and southern classroom walls. This type was the most commonly constructed in the 1950s in Queensland.

In 1954 the type was improved by replacing the proliferation of stumps in the understorey with a timber truss that spanned the width of the classrooms above and provided an unimpeded play space. This truss system, introduced to support Boulton & Paul prefabricated units, was subsequently adopted for conventional timber-framed school buildings. The trusses were distinctive for their tapered legs.

Block A was orientated approximately east–west, with the eastern end angled towards the south. The upper floor contained six 24-by-24-foot (7.3 by 7.3 m) classrooms and two teachers rooms. Three of the classrooms were interconnected by large folding timber doors. A semi-enclosed staircase attached to the verandah was located at the western end. The ground floor was completely enclosed, with toilets, locker rooms and store rooms within the brick section at the eastern end; a "Students" Space' in the centre; and three classrooms at the eastern end - a Commercial Classroom, Science Lecture Room, and a Science Laboratory. Two store rooms were located between the science rooms. The timber floor trusses were visible within the classrooms and students' space. Banks of awning windows along the southern classroom walls looked out over the low-lying grounds and surrounding neighbourhood, while the verandah faced higher ground to the north that would eventually be levelled and turned into a courtyard.

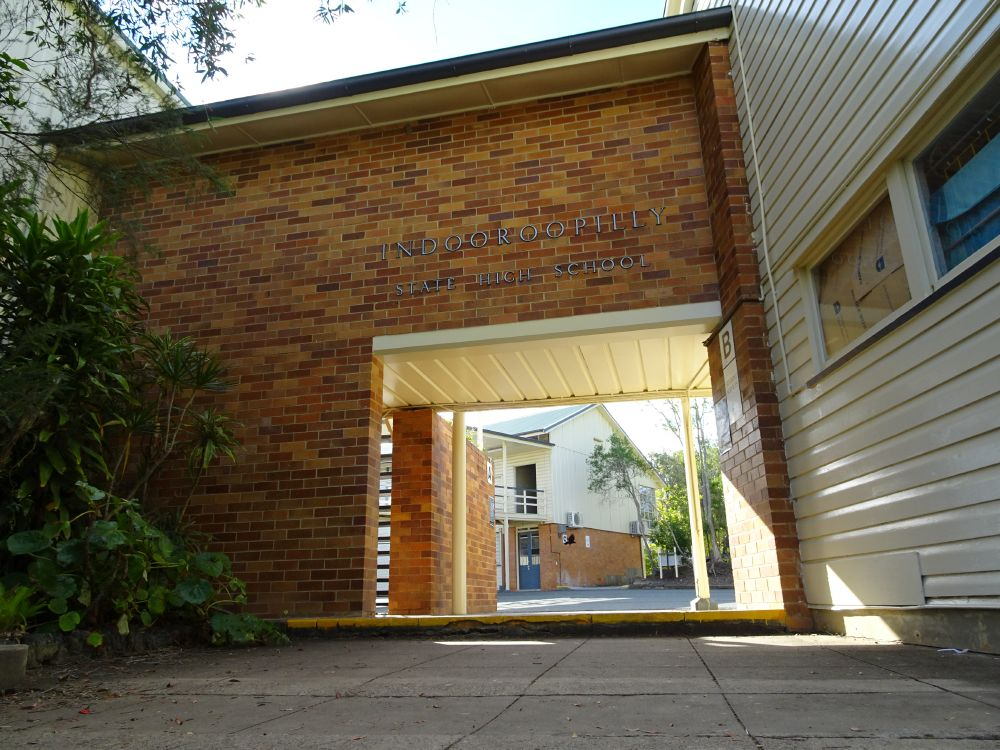
Entranceway between Block A (left) and Block B (right), 2016

The school was soon extended with the addition of a second building (known as Block B as of 2025), which also incorporated Boulton & Paul prefabricated units for the upper floor, but the west end and brick ground floor were purpose-designed by the DPW. Work on Block B was approved in January 1954, and it was erected during 1954. The new building was linked to the east end of Block A by a raised walkway, and was orientated with its eastern end angling towards the northeast, following the contours of the site. Shorter than Block A, Block B originally housed manual training and administration.

While standard designs predominated in the 1950s, non-standard schools were also constructed, generally in Brisbane and the metropolitan areas where the population was stable and brick supplies guaranteed. Often substantial buildings with extensive use of brick and concrete, these schools introduced many innovative ideas which influenced later standards. Brick was progressively used more frequently in high schools for end walls, and was also commonly used to enclose toilets and stairwells and for landscape elements.

In Block B, the Boulton & Paul section of the building contained a sheet metal room at the eastern end and a woodwork room, with a store room and saw room in between. On the western side of the woodwork room were store and staff rooms. The purpose-designed west end of the upper floor was narrower in width. It contained an internal staircase, a small store room, a waiting room, and the principal's office, which was located in the southwest corner. The brick ground floor comprised toilets at the eastern end, a timber store, and a large change room with bench seating around the edges (temporarily used as a trade-drawing room in 1956). The western end was semi-enclosed, originally designated as a students' quiet area. In the southwest corner, a thick concrete column supported the principal's office above, and the overhang of the gable roof was supported by steel posts.

The landscaping design of Indooroopilly State High School introduced new ideas in the integration of external built landscape elements (such as stairs, planter boxes and pavements) with adjacent functional areas. As the school grew, spaces between buildings and at the ends of blocks were purpose-designed to address ground level changes, improve circulation, and create gardens, seating and play areas for the students. Between blocks A and B an entranceway was created beneath the connecting walkway. A two-storey brick wall ran along the southern side of the walkway with metal lettering -'INDOOROOPILLY STATE HIGH SCHOOL' – attached above an opening. The entranceway was fronted by a concrete pavement and steps with adjacent planter box. Early class photographs show students arranged in rows on these steps, with the entranceway visible in the background. Projecting perpendicular to the walkway on the north side was a tall brick planter box and adjacent set of timber stairs with tubular metal handrails. A flag pole was attached to the north face of the planter box.

In 1954–55, a third classroom wing (known as Block C as of 2025) was added to the site, to the north of and parallel with Block A. On the upper level, it was a standard DPW timber school building type, comprising four 24-by-24-foot (7.3 by 7.3 m) classrooms, one larger 32-by-24-foot (9.8 by 7.3 m) classroom (designated as a commercial room), a north-facing verandah with clerestory lighting above the verandah roof, and a semi-enclosed stair with purpose-designed roof at the western end of the verandah. An internal staircase at the eastern end led to an elevated covered walkway, which linked the eastern ends of blocks C and A. The lower level of Block C was predominantly open play area supported by round concrete columns, with a locker room (supported by timber trusses) and a brick cloak room at the eastern end. Due to the steep slope, the ground floor was cut into the site with a retaining wall along the north side of the play area. This made the verandah accessible from ground level at the eastern end, via a short flight of concrete steps flanked by brick planter boxes.

A second stage of Block C and landscaping works were constructed in late 1955. A 24-by-44-foot (7.3 by 13.4 m) classroom, designated as a drawing room, was constructed between blocks A and C at their western ends, forming a link between them. Orientated approximately north–south, this addition (known as Building A6 as of 2025) had a shallow gable roof, extensive glazing along the eastern wall of the upper floor, and high-level windows along the western wall. The ground floor was open play area with bike racks at either end and access to a bicycle storage room under the western end of Block C. Supported mainly on round concrete columns and brick end walls, an opening in the western wall had a special feature - lozenge-shaped concrete columns that supported four large "round the corner" doors, that allowed the underfloor area to be sealed off from westerly winds (doors now removed).

Landscaping works included the formation of a flat, bitumen parade ground in the newly created courtyard between blocks A and C. To address ground level changes between the blocks, a long set of concrete steps ran from a planter box at the northeast corner of Building A6 and curved around to run parallel with Block A, before ending at a right angle in line with the girls locker rooms. Below these steps the ground was concrete pavement, scored to resemble square concrete pavers.

As more buildings were added to the site, rooms in earlier buildings were converted for other uses. For example, in 1954–55 the western end of the ground floor became the chemistry laboratory, physics laboratory and science lecture room, while the students' space became a library and reading room. The western classroom on the first floor became a physics lecture room.

Throughout the late 1950s the school continued to expand to successively accommodate all four high school years. A new two storey block which incorporated the latest structural system of steel open-web joists (known as Block D as of 2025) was built north of Block B, in two stages, during 1957–58. From 1957, steel open-web joists that spanned further and removed more understorey stumps replaced the use of timber trusses. This structural system was employed with reinforced concrete piers to support large loads at minimal costs. This was further refined in 1959 by replacing the concrete piers and open-web joist with a steel portal frame that was employed extensively in the 1960s and 1970s.

Orientated north-south and cut into the slope, the upper floor of Block D was at ground level along the western side, with a battered concrete retaining wall forming the western wall of the lower level. The upper level was of the same standard timber classroom type as Block C, with a west-facing verandah and clerestory lighting above the verandah roof. When completed, it contained seven identical 24-by-24-foot (7.3 by 7.3 m) classrooms, all interconnected by a single door adjacent to the eastern wall. Brick-enclosed stairwells were located at either end of the block, leading down to a large recreation area with a concrete floor. Along the open eastern side were lozenge-shaped concrete columns supporting the steel open-web joists. By late 1959, parts of the lower floor had been enclosed to form temporary classrooms.

A second, larger courtyard area was created north of Block C by the addition of two more blocks in 1958–59 - a domestic science block (known as Block G as of 2025) and a classroom block (known as Block E as of 2025). In order to construct them, however, the area had to be lowered and flattened, with excavation works taking place during 1958. Some of the fill was deposited in the western school grounds, where tennis and basketball courts were later formed. The level of the new courtyard (referred to as "Town Square" as of 2025) was the same as the ground floor of Block C, which meant that the concrete steps and planter box at the east end of Block C's verandah were demolished. Blocks E and G were arranged at right angles to each other and formed the northwest corner of "Town Square". Block G, the smaller of the two, was oriented north–south with its western wall approximately in line with the west end of Block C. Block E ran east–west and part of its lower floor was cut into the slope.

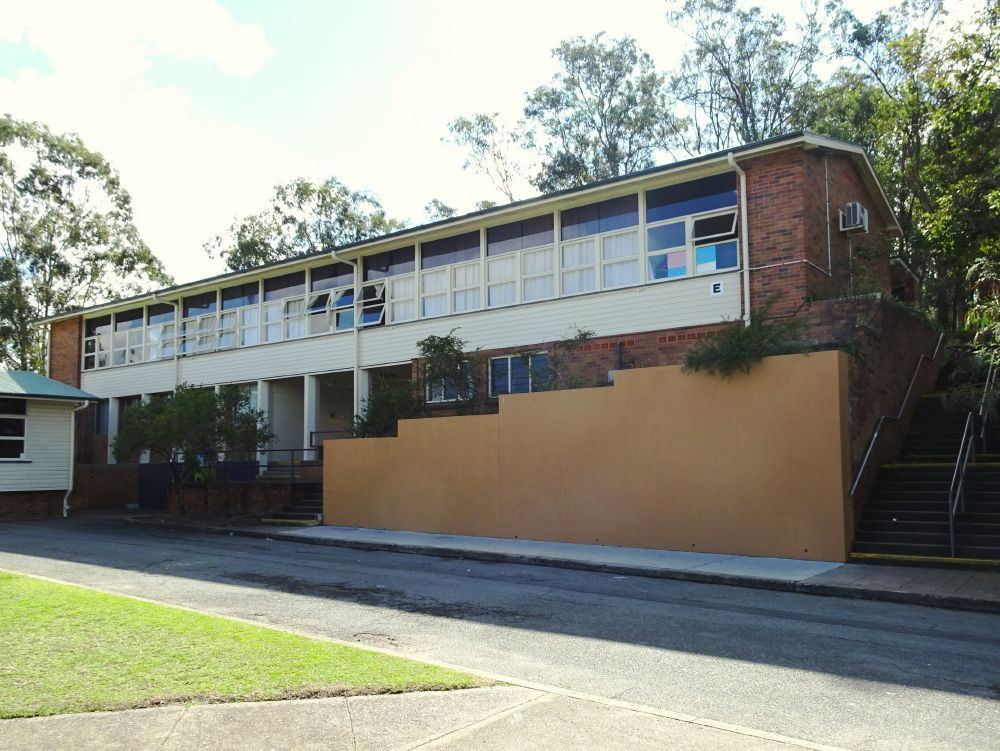
Southern side of Block E, 2016

Block E was constructed using standard timber school building construction types with steel open-web trusses supporting the first floor. It had a north-facing verandah, with clerestory lighting above the verandah roof, and contained four 24-by-24-foot (7.3 by 7.3 m) classrooms and a 12-by-24-foot (3.7 by 7.3 m) teachers room. A semi-enclosed timber stair was located at the western end of the verandah. The eastern end of the verandah was at ground level and had a concrete-paved entrance bay with a vertical timber louvre screen in the northern wall. The ends of the building and part of the ground floor were constructed from brick. The ground floor was largely open play area, with the pavement extending north of the verandah line, surrounded by a concrete retaining wall.

Block G was a single storey, gable-roofed building on a raised brick base, with its floor level slightly lower than the ground floor of Block E. It had a passageway enclosed with glass louvres along the western side, and contained classrooms of different sizes for domestic science, including a dressmaking room, dining room, cookery room and lecture room. A purpose-designed brick portico, glazed with metal louvers and fixed glass, formed the entrance at the southern end, and by 1961 a covered area linked it to the western end of Block C.

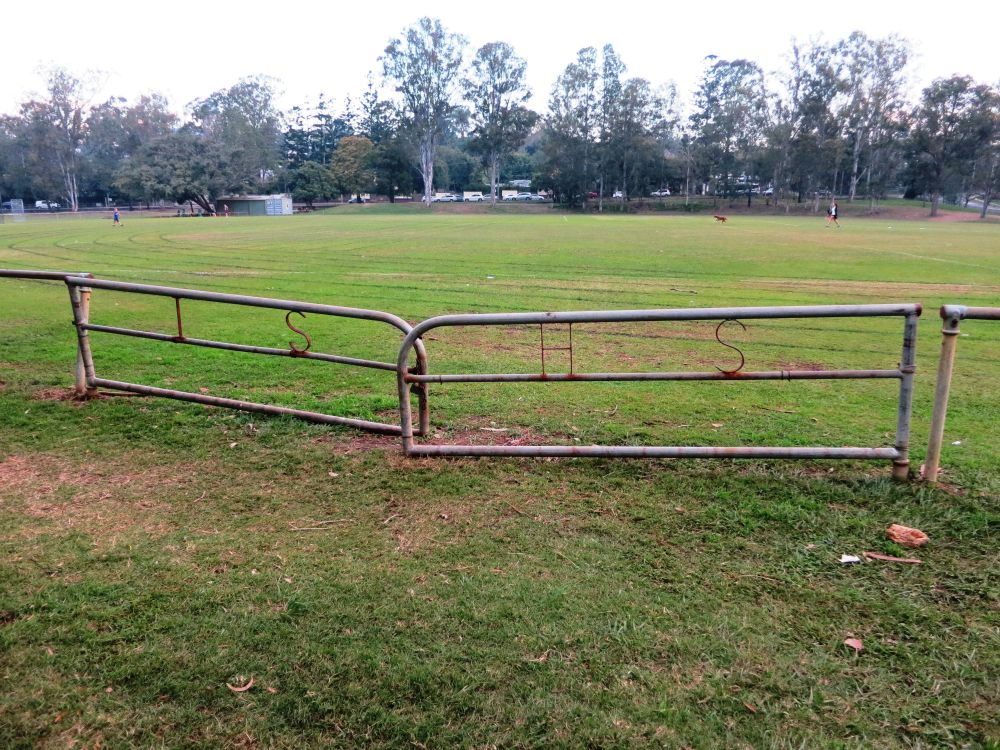
Looking south across sports oval, 2016

The school grounds continued to be improved throughout the late 1950s and early 1960s. By 1959, the scrub northwest of the school buildings had been cleared, and the bush to the northeast had been thinned out to a scatter of trees. In the low-lying southwest corner the school sports oval was formed and a properly laid-down cricket pitch constructed. This was followed in 1960–61 by the formation of new bitumen access driveways - one leading from McCaul Street (at the northeast corner of the site) to the northeast corner of 'Town Square'; and one from the intersection of Turner and Ward streets that ascended the slope along the southern sides of blocks A and B, and curved northwards to pass between blocks B and D. Further bitumen driveways formed a loop around "Town Square".

In 1960, the area around Block E was re-landscaped to provide better circulation. This included new pathways, stairs, retaining walls and garden beds. Toilets were constructed under the eastern end of the building (within sub-floor space) and a new, wide pedestrian stairway, with adjacent garden bed and planter boxes, was also constructed adjacent to the east end of Block E, linking "Town Square" to a pathway that led north to McCaul Street. By 1964, two concrete pathways had been constructed across the central lawn of "Town Square", converging near the base of the stairway.

By 1960, the school had a population approaching 800 students. Student numbers continued to grow, with a sudden increase in 1964, when Year 8 students were transferred from the primary school system to become the first year of high school.

Changes were made to the 1950s buildings over time, new buildings were added to the site, and improvements made to the grounds. A tuckshop was built under the west end of Block C by 1963 (since removed), and a science block (Block F as of 2025) was built in 1965. The room under the east end of Block C was also partitioned in 1968. In the grounds, two cricket practice wickets (extant as of 2025) were built just east of the oval by 1963; levelling work occurred west of the school buildings in the 1960s, and two basketball courts and four tennis courts opened in 1965. New trees were also planted to the north of Block E. During the 1960s the creek in the southern part of the school grounds was progressively filled in, and underground stormwater pipes were laid, from the east side of the oval to the east side of the grounds.

Further alterations were made to the 1950s buildings in the 1970s and 1980s. A two-storey building was added to the west of Block G in c. 1972, and Block G's interior was reconfigured. Around this time a small Armoury room was constructed beneath building A6. The centre of the ground floor of Block D was enclosed for an arts and crafts room and a covered walkway and courtyard area were added along its eastern side. In 1979 the first floor of building A6 was remodelled to become a junior science room, with a storeroom constructed at the north end. The first floor rooms at the east end of Block B were reconfigured to become two classrooms and an office in c. 1981 (at some point the internal staircase in the west end of Block B was demolished and the space merged with the adjacent office). A textiles room was constructed on the ground floor of Block E by enclosing the southwest section of the play area in c. 1984. On the ground floor of Block C, a new tuck shop was constructed in the centre of the play area and a stationary and book store at the eastern end in c. 1984. The lower floor of Block D was converted for different uses in the 1980s, including metalwork and woodwork shops. By 1989 other minor changes to partitioning had occurred in blocks A, B and D.

Additional school buildings have been constructed around the 1950s complex on the lower ground to the west, south and east. These included: Block H (administration), a demountable building (west of Block E), and a large assembly hall (west of Block C) by 1977; and Blocks J (manual arts), I (library), K (music, Block L as of 2025), and a science building (southeast of Block F) between 1979 and 1986. Demountable buildings were also temporarily used by the school in the 1970s and 1980s, including one placed near the east end of Block C. Other buildings were added to the school between 1986 and 2016, in an outer arc. Alterations to the 1950s buildings and landscape elements since 2000 include the refurbishment of the toilets in blocks A and B, replacement of the roof sheeting of blocks A, B, C, D, E & G, and the rebuilding of the Block E southeast garden retaining wall with rendered concrete block.

Improvements to the school grounds included the planting of a "rainforest" area east of Block F in the early 1980s. In the 1990s the grounds were progressively developed and improved by the grounds committee, led by deputy principal Lorna Whelan. The committee's projects included planting "up to 100 or more trees" around the time of Arbor Day. In recognition of her contribution, in 1999 the entire school grounds were named "The Whelen Reserve".

The school held a belated official opening ceremony on 5 July 1988, with the opening performed by the Hon. Brian Littleproud, Minister for Education. In 2004 a school history book was published to celebrate the school's 50th Jubilee.

In 2024, the buildings were incorporated into the school's 70th anniversary celebrations run by then principal Michael Hornby.

The school remains a scenic part of Indooroopilly, and the 1950s buildings and landscaping remain at the heart of the school. It is important to the area as a focus for the community, being the venue for numerous social, sporting, and educational programs and events.

As of 2025, the school has buildings labelled from A through to Z, however is missing an O block, which is the topic of some speculation within the community.

== Description ==
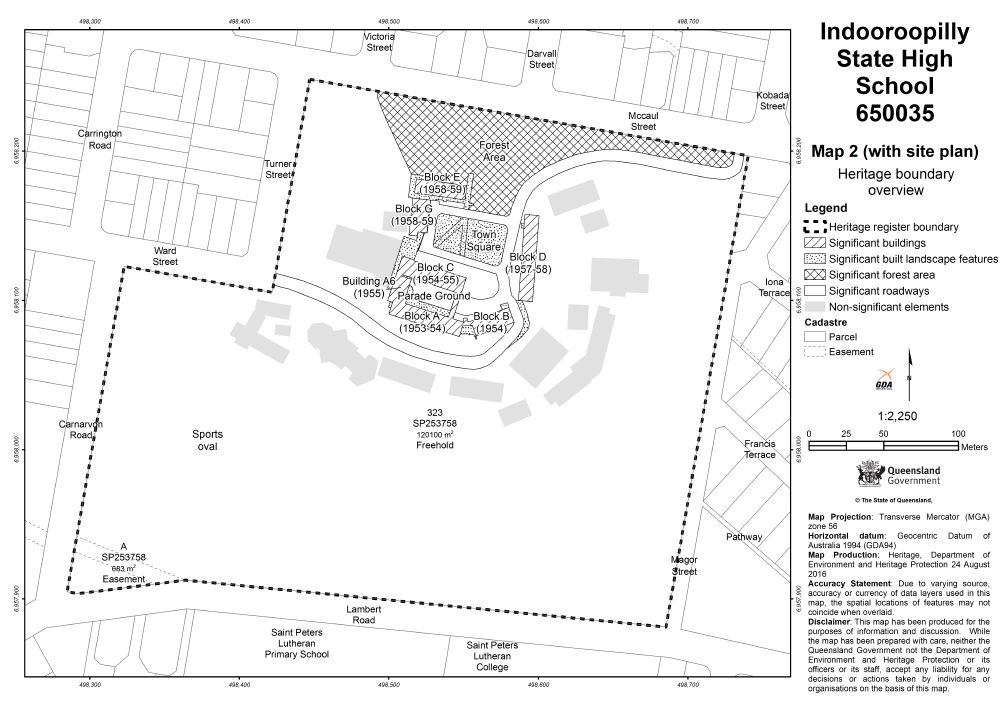
Site map, 2016

Indooroopilly State High School occupies a 12-hectare (30-acre) site in the suburb of Indooroopilly, approximately 7 kilometres (4.3 mi) southwest of Brisbane CBD. The site steeply slopes down from the north, and is accessed by an entrance driveway off the corner of Ward and Turner streets to the west, and a driveway from McCaul Street to the north. The site is also bounded by Lambert Road to the south, Carnarvon Road to the west, and Magor Street and Robertson's Park to the east. The school retains its original complex of seven timber and brick buildings (constructed 1953–59), which are centrally located on a high, flat plateau area at the northern end of the site. Between the buildings are courtyard, assembly and play spaces, and circulation is facilitated by covered walkway connections and concrete stairs, pathways and pavements. The landscaped grounds are well established, and include bushland, mature trees, planter boxes, retaining walls, tennis / basketball courts and playing fields.

The seven significant buildings within the school complex are:

- Block A (1953–54)
- Block B (1954)
- Block C (1954–55)
- Building A6 (1955)
- Block D (1957–58)
- Block E (1958–59)
- Block G (1958–59)

These buildings are constructed from a range of standard materials and structural methods employed by the Department of Public Works (DPW) during the 1950s, including: prefabricated Boulton & Paul (B&P) timber units (blocks A and B); timber trusses (blocks A and C); and steel open-web trusses (blocks D and E). Building A6, Block G, and the western end of Block B are purpose-designed buildings.

The early site planning of the school grounds remains intact and is typical of Queensland schools during the mid to late 1950s. The long classroom blocks are arranged organically, following the contours of the site and linked around courtyard spaces. In the southwest corner of the complex are blocks A and C, positioned parallel to each other in an approximately east–west orientation. They are linked by Building A6 at the western end and a raised, covered walkway at the eastern end; and encircle a bitumen parade ground. Branching off from the east end of Block A is Block B, angled slightly towards the north, with a brick entranceway in between. Block D, the longest block, extends northwards from near the eastern end of Block B. To the north of Block C and west of Block D is a large, flat courtyard area known as "Town Square". The northwest corner of the square is defined by blocks E and G, which are positioned at right angles to each other. Block E is orientated east–west, and Block G, to its south, is orientated north–south.

Non-significant elements of the buildings include air conditioning units (interior and exterior); replacement windows and doors; replacement wall and ceiling linings; accessibility ramps; and modern floor linings (carpet and linoleum), suspended ceilings, kitchenettes, fluorescent lighting and ceiling fans.

=== Block A (1953–54) ===
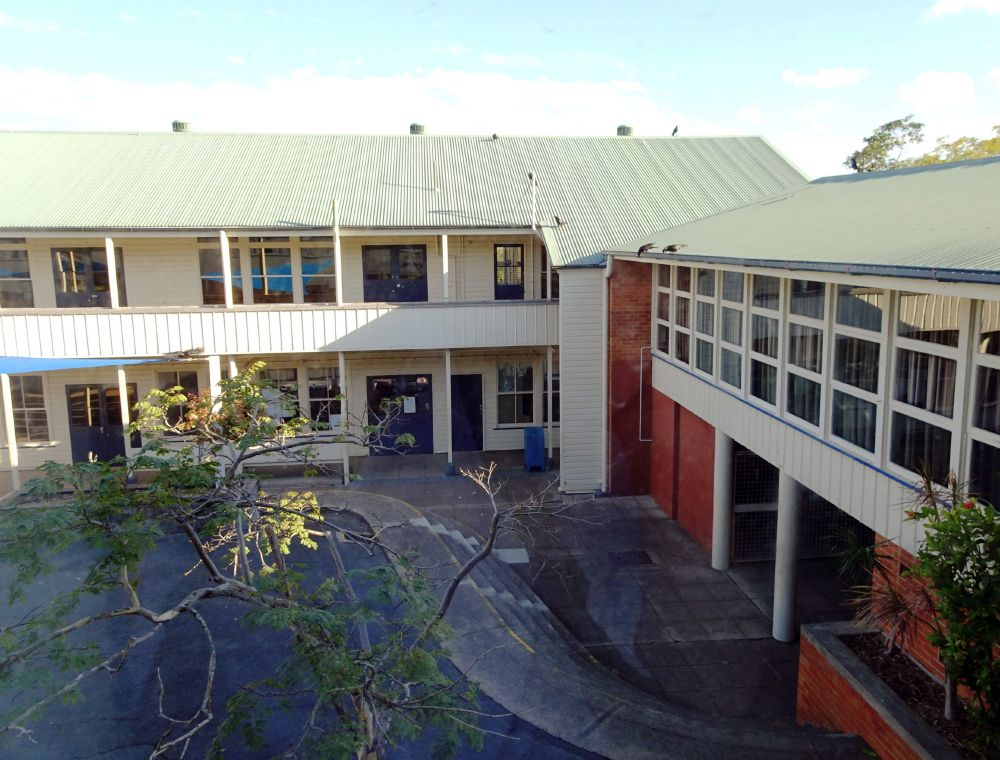
View of Block A (left) and Building A6 (right) at SW corner of parade ground, 2016

Block A is a long, two-storey building with a corrugated metal-clad gable roof that continues over a north-facing verandah. It contains classrooms on the first floor and west end of the ground floor, and toilets at the east end of the ground floor. The first floor is constructed from timber prefabricated Boulton & Paul timber units, and the ground floor is constructed from DPW-designed timber floor trusses (west end) and brick (east end toilets and store rooms).

The exterior is clad in a variety of materials including: timber chamferboards (with the edges of vertical timber boards visible between each panel of the B&P wall units); vertical profiled metal sheeting (east facade first floor, south facade ground floor); and orange face brick (toilets and the southwestern corner of the ground floor).

The southern facade features large banks of timber-framed top-hung awning windows along the first floor. The raked eaves are unlined and supported by timber struts fixed to window mullions below. At the west end, the ground floor wall is set back and divided into bays by the projecting tapered edges of the timber trusses. Windows within the bays are awning windows with modern louvres above. The brick eastern end has high-level windows. The east and west walls are blank.

All access is via the northern facade. Timber stairs at the western end, which also provide access to the adjacent Building A6, are semi-enclosed with single-skin walls of exposed timber studs and chamferboard cladding, and have a timber post and rail balustrade. The first floor verandah has a raked ceiling clad in flat sheeting with exposed rafters aligned with joins in the wall panels, square timber posts, and a timber floor. Timber-framed bag racks form the balustrade, and are externally clad in profiled metal sheeting.

The ground floor verandah has a concrete pavement floor and corrugated metal-clad ceiling. Square timber posts and a concrete spoon drain run along the outer edge. The concrete pavement is scored to resemble square pavers and steps up toward the eastern end, in line with the brick-enclosed section. The pavement continues around the northwest corner of the building to terminate in a landing with tubular metal handrails. From here, a short flight of concrete steps leads down to a modern concrete pathway.

Windows in the northern wall are large double-hung timber sashes (with fanlights above the first floor windows), and original doors are single or double, part-glazed timber doors with v-jointed (VJ) panelling.

The interior of the first floor comprises four central classrooms, separated from an eastern and a western classroom by two narrow store rooms. The walls and ceilings are lined with flat sheeting, and most walls have rounded cover strips. Vertical members of the structural system are evident on the north and south walls, between pairs of windows. Two sets of original bi-fold timber panelled doors between classrooms are retained, as well as single panelled timber doors between some rooms.

On the ground floor, walls within the brick toilets and store rooms are generally plastered or face brick, and floors are concrete. Doors include early high-waisted or vertical board doors, both with original hardware, and some high-level windows contain fixed glass louvres. Classrooms are lined with flat sheeting with rounded cover strips, and the tapered legs of the timber trusses are exposed within the space. Two of the classrooms have metal floor skirtings. Vertically sliding, timber-framed blackboards are retained in one classroom on the first floor and one on the ground floor.

=== Block B (1954) ===
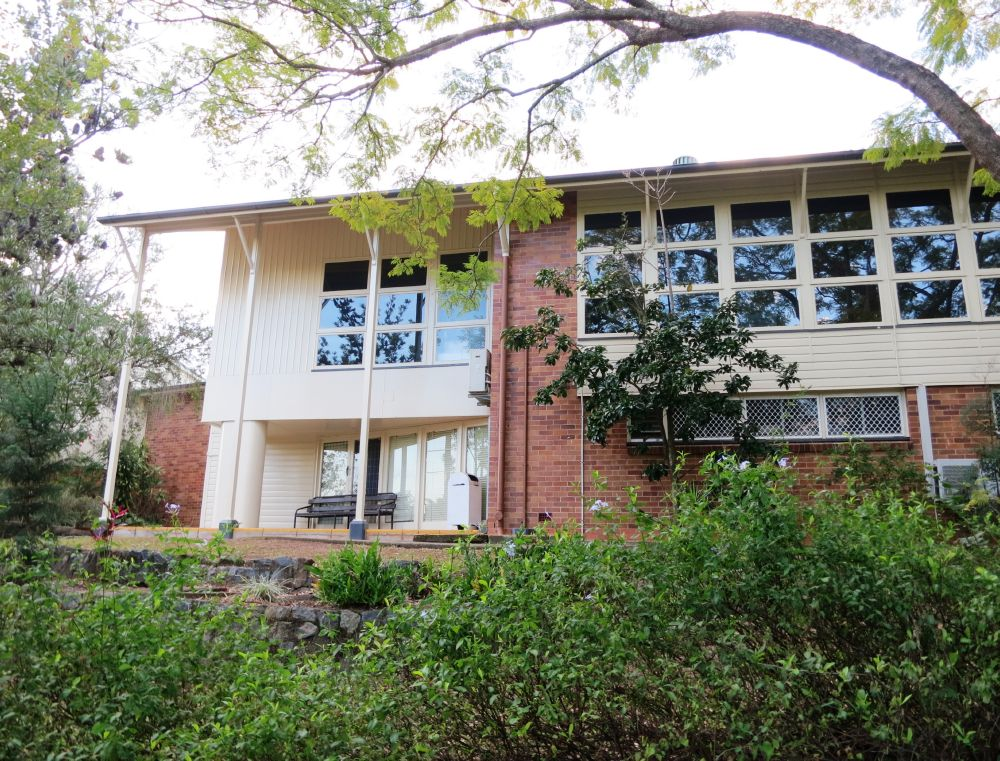
South side of Block B, combining prefabricated and purpose-designed sections, 2016

Block B is a long, two-storey building, with a corrugated metal-clad gable roof that continues over a north-facing verandah. Most of the first floor is of prefabricated timber B&P units, containing two classrooms and a store room, and stands on a brick ground floor containing toilets and a large store room. The narrower western end is purpose-designed, containing an office and store room on the first floor and a former outdoor area on the ground floor (enclosed with modern partitions to form a small office).

The exterior of the eastern end is clad in timber chamferboards (with the edges of vertical timber boards visible between each panel of the B&P wall units) vertical profiled metal sheeting (east facade first floor) and orange face brick. The raked eaves of the south wall are unlined and supported by timber struts fixed to window mullions below.

The purpose-designed western end is clad predominantly in timber chamferboards. The walls of the former Principal's Office in the southwest corner are set back and clad with vertical profiled metal sheeting and flat sheeting. The southwest corner of the office stands on a thick, rounded-rectangular concrete column, and three tall steel posts support the overhang of the roof.

Most of the early timber joinery has been retained, including: top-hung awning windows to the former Principal's Office and the south wall of the B&P classrooms; double-hung sash windows to the verandah wall (with fanlights above) and ground floor store room; and fixed glass louvres to the toilets. Other ground floor windows have been replaced with metal-framed sliders. Early doors include double, part-glazed timber doors with VJ panelling, and vertical board doors, both with original hardware.

The first floor verandah is accessed via timber stairs at the eastern end that are semi-enclosed with timber-framed glazed screens. The verandah has a timber floor, square timber posts and a raked ceiling lined with flat sheeting. Timber-framed bag racks form the balustrade, and are externally clad in profiled metal sheeting. A framed section of chamferboards near the western end of the verandah wall indicates a former opening to an internal stair (now removed).

The ground floor verandah has a profiled metal-lined ceiling, concrete pavement floor and is edged by square timber posts and a spoon drain. The pavement, scored to resemble square pavers, extends north of the verandah line at the eastern and western ends.

On the first floor, the interior walls and ceilings of both sections are lined in flat sheeting and skirtings are timber, of a simple profile. Single panelled timber doors survive between some rooms. In the B&P section, vertical members of the structural system are evident on the north and south walls, between pairs of windows. In the former Principal's Office, the location of removed partitions is evident in the ceiling lining. A small alcove remains in the western wall, which originally contained a sink (now a kitchenette). The ground floor has a concrete slab floor, which has been covered with modern linings in various locations, and painted brick and plastered walls. Early timber perimeter seating is retained in the central store room.

Brick entranceway and stairs between Block A and Block B (c. 1954)

A raised covered walkway with a skillion roof links the first floor verandahs of blocks A and B. The southern side of the walkway is two-storey brick wall with a ground floor opening that forms an entranceway to the parade ground area. Fixed above the opening is metal lettering - "INDOOROOPILLY STATE HIGH SCHOOL". The ground beneath the walkway is concrete pavement, accessed from the southern side by a set of steps with adjacent planter box and garden area. Projecting perpendicular to the walkway on the north side is a tall brick planter box and adjacent set of timber stairs with tubular metal handrails. A metal flag pole is attached to the north face of the planter box. The north side of the walkway is open, with a timber rail balustrade.

=== Block C (1954–55) ===
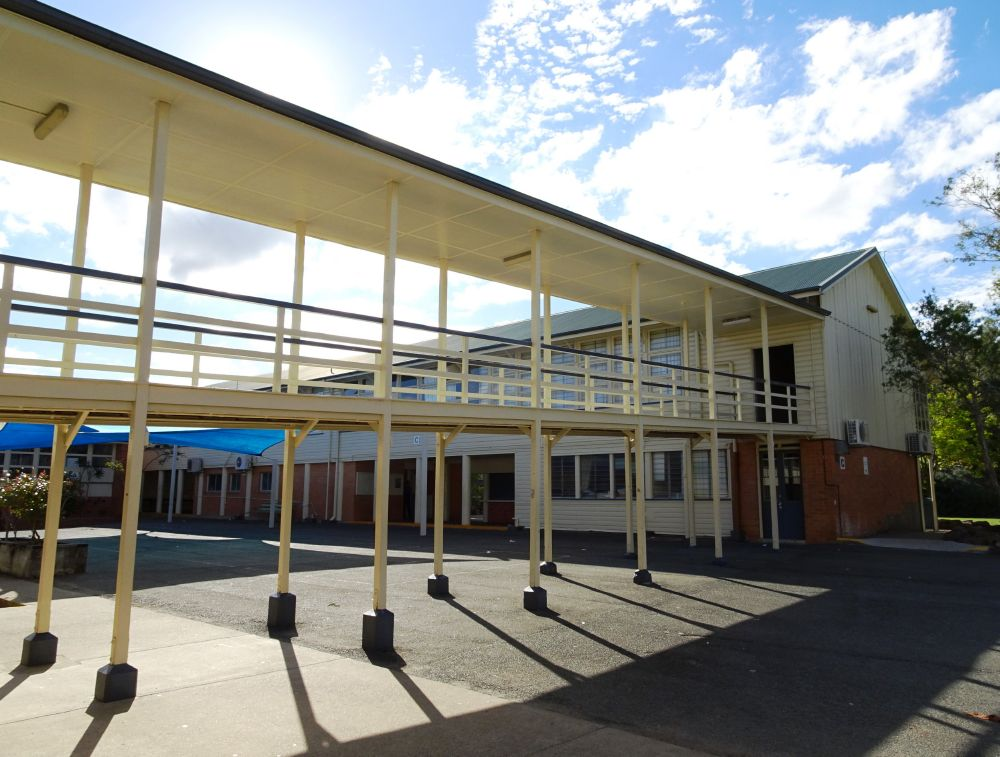
Covered walkway linking Block A and Block C, looking north, 2016

Block C is a long, two-storey building with a corrugated metal-clad gable roof and north-facing verandah. The first floor contains classrooms while the ground floor, formerly open play space with storage at the east end, has 1980s brick enclosures (tuck shop and former book store) that are not of heritage significance. The first floor is supported by a combination of large, round concrete posts, timber trusses (in the rooms at the east end); and round metal posts (supporting the first floor verandah). Brick walls define the ends of the building. The building is predominantly clad in timber chamferboards, with the exception of the eastern elevation first floor, which is clad in profiled metal sheeting. The raked eaves of the south wall are supported by timber struts fixed to window mullions below.

Access to the first floor is via a set of semi-enclosed timber stairs at the western end of the verandah, and an internal staircase at the eastern end. The separate gable roof over the western stairs is partly supported by metal poles that are angled to form a V shape, and an early sink survives in the northwest corner of the landing. The eastern end of the verandah and part of the western end are enclosed with timber-framed glazed screens.

Early timber joinery is retained throughout the first floor, with large banks of top-hung awning windows with centre-pivoting fanlights along the south facade and double-hung windows with centre-pivoting clerestory windows along the verandah wall. Early doors include double, two-light doors with VJ panels to the verandah and east stairwell, and panelled, two-light interior doors, both with original hardware.

The first floor verandah has a low-pitched skillion roof, set below clerestory windows; a raked ceiling lined with flat sheeting and rounded cover strips; a timber floor and square timber verandah posts. Timber-framed bag racks form the balustrade, and are externally clad in profiled metal sheeting. Metal grills fixed above the bag racks are recent and not of heritage significance. Large rectangular vents (date unknown) are positioned below some windows in the verandah wall.

The classroom interiors on the first floor are generally lined in flat sheeting on the walls and ceilings, with rounded cover strips to some walls and simple timber skirtings.

The unenclosed areas of the ground floor have ceilings lined with flat sheeting (with cover strips in some sections), and a concrete pavement floor scored to resemble square pavers. Below the first floor verandah the ceiling is unlined. The rooms at the eastern end have timber double hung windows (north wall), glass louvres (south wall), internal walls and ceilings lined with flat sheeting with rounded cover strips, and the tapered legs of the timber trusses are exposed within the space.

A raised covered walkway with a flat roof links the eastern ends of blocks A and C. Constructed from timber, it is supported by square timber posts and has a three-rail timber balustrade. The floor is provided additional support by diagonal struts attached to the posts. The ceiling is lined with flat sheeting with rounded cover strips.

=== Building A6 (1955) ===
Building A6 is a highset, masonry building with a corrugated metal-clad gable roof, and is set on a north–south axis. Smaller than the classroom blocks, it connects Block A and Block C at their western ends and forms an edge to the parade ground. It contains a single large room and a store room on the first floor, and the ground floor is open, with some sections enclosed for storage. A narrow section of the building, containing storage on the ground floor and a former corridor on the first floor, extends north to run alongside the west end of Block C, and connects with its western staircase. Walls are predominantly orange face brick with some sections of profiled metal sheeting (below window sill height) and flat sheeting. The brick end walls extend to form wing walls in line with the horizontal eaves on the eastern facade. Large concrete columns of rounded or lozenge-shaped profile support the central section of the building.

Banks of top-hung awning windows occupy the full length of the east facade of the first floor, while a single row of high awning windows runs along the west facade. Access to the first floor is via a small stair at the northern end of the building, and via the landing of Block A's western stairs at the southern end. One early door survives: a high-waisted, single-light door with a VJ panel at the southern first floor entrance.

The interior of the first floor has plaster walls, timber skirtings of a simple profile, and a modern fitout.

The ground floor is mostly open play space, with a concrete pavement floor scored to resemble square pavers. The northeast corner has been enclosed with face brick to form a store room (former armoury) and the southern end is enclosed with face brick and metal caging to form a sports store. A brick planter box is cut into the terrain on the east side of the store room. The concrete pavement extends west beyond the building footprint, connecting with a concrete pathway and stairs along the west side of both Block C and Building A6.

=== Parade Ground (1954–55) ===
The parade ground between Block A, Block C and Building A6 has an upper level of gently sloping ground lined with bitumen, and a lower level (along the southern and western edges) of concrete pavement scored to resemble square pavers. Connecting the levels is a long, curving set of concrete stairs that run from the brick planter box at the northeast corner of Building A6 and curve around to run parallel with Block A. Modern shade structures and concrete planter boxes within the parade ground area are not of heritage significance.

=== Block D (1957–58) ===
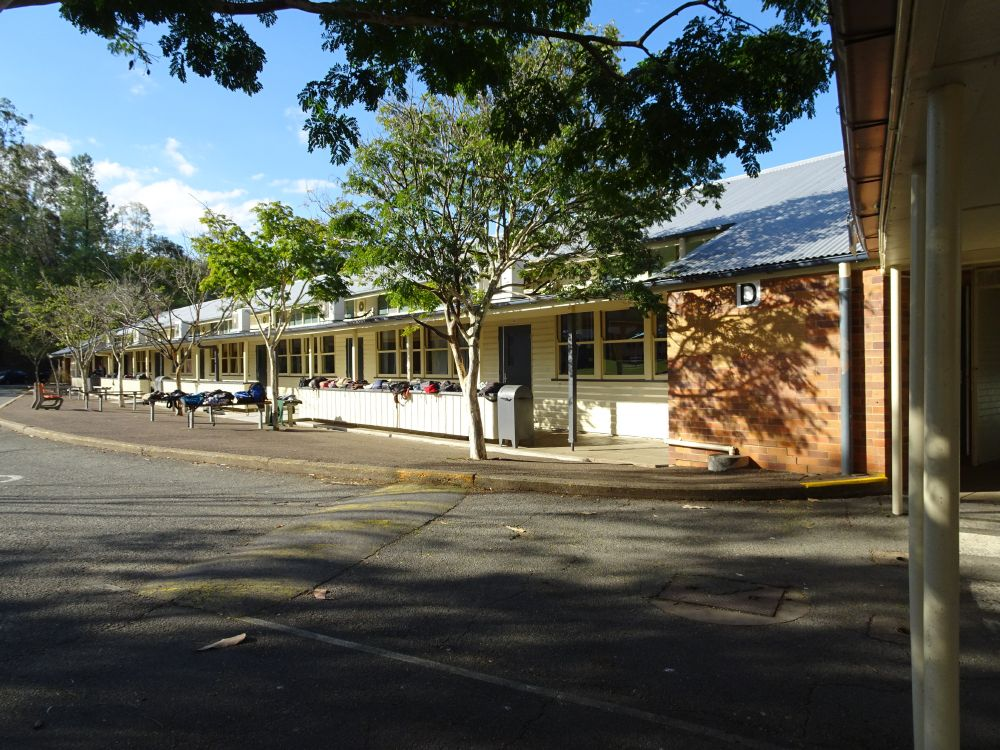
Western side of Block D, 2016

Block D is a long, two storey building, orientated on a north–south axis and cut into the sloping terrain, so that the upper floor of the building is at ground level on the western side. Constructed predominantly from orange brick, it has a corrugated metal-clad gable roof, with the eaves on the eastern side supported by timber struts fixed to window mullions below. The ground floor contains classrooms connected by a west-facing verandah, while the understorey, formerly open play space, has been progressively enclosed to form additional classrooms. An open-web metal truss system supports the ground floor, held up by lozenge-shaped concrete columns and a battered concrete retaining wall which forms the western wall of the understorey.

Timber-framed, top-hung awning windows with centre-pivoting fanlights run almost the entire length of the first floor eastern facade. Stairwells with separate gable roofs are located at each end of the building, enclosed by facebrick walls glazed with timber-framed screens with wired-glass insets. The stairs are concrete and have tubular metal pole handrails.

The western verandah has a low-pitched skillion roof, with clerestory windows (glass louvres) above; square timber posts; and a concrete pavement floor scored to resemble square pavers. The verandah wall is clad in timber chamferboards, and the raked ceiling is lined with flat sheeting with cover strips. A timber-framed glazed screen is located next to the northern verandah entrance with a partially buried brick planter box in front. Timber-framed bag racks along the verandah edge have profiled metal cladding on the exterior. Windows are timber-framed, double-hung sash windows, and all verandah doors have been replaced.

The ground floor level comprises seven classrooms of the same size, interconnected by single, panelled, two-light timber doors adjacent to the eastern wall. The classroom walls are lined in flat sheeting with rounded cover-strips up to dado level, and ceilings are lined in flat sheeting. Early angled hylo-boards with inbuilt cupboards are retained in each classroom.

The understorey level is accessed by a 1970s covered walkway that is not of heritage significance. Enclosing walls date from different periods, with those at the eastern end, constructed from profiled metal sheeting and glass louvres, being the earliest. A number of classrooms and store rooms have been formed by internal partitions, with the open-web steel trusses remaining visible. Early doors include internal single, part-glazed timber doors with VJ panelling. This level comprises primarily science labs.

=== 'Town Square' (1958–65) and Stairway (1960) ===
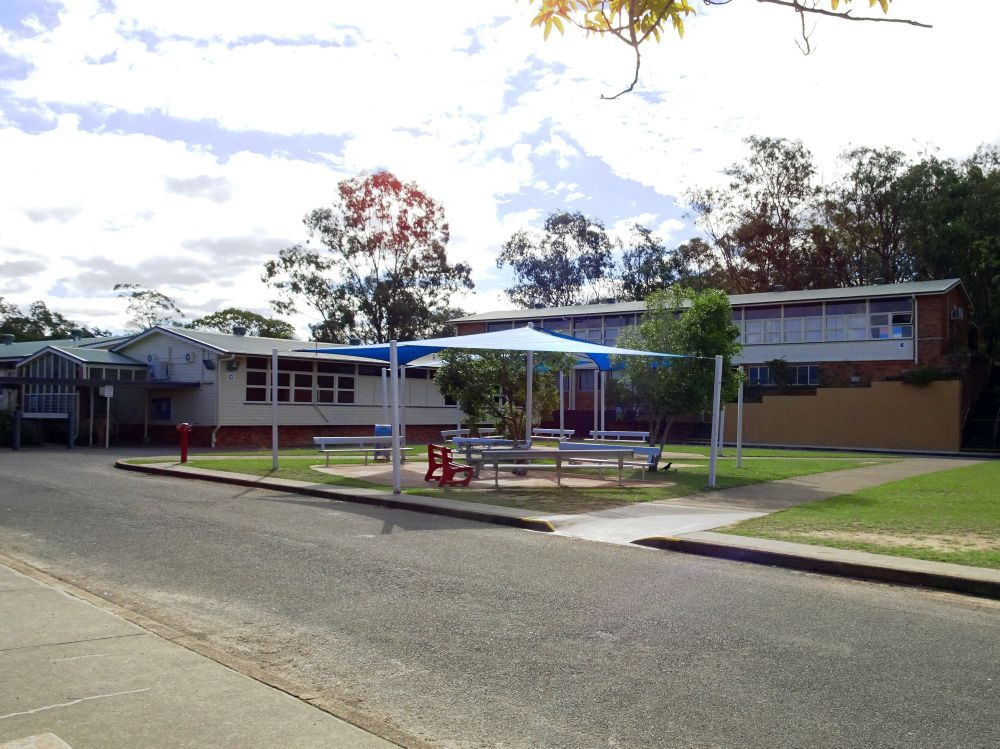
Looking NW across 'Town Square' towards Block E (right) and Block G (left), 2016

The large courtyard area known as "Town Square" comprises a large lawn encircled by bitumen driveways and blocks D (east) C (south) G (west) and E (north). Other gardens and grassed areas are located in front of blocks C and D. Two concrete pathways cross the lawn and converge at a point near the base of a wide, concrete stairway adjacent to the east end of Block E. The stairway ascends the steep slope and links to a pathway to McCaul Street. Orange brick walls form a retaining wall along the east side, terminating at a brick planter box at the base. Tall brick-enclosed garden beds form the western side of the stairway and wrap around the southeast corner of Block E. One garden wall has been recently replaced by rendered concrete blockwork. Tubular metal handrails run down the centre of the stairway and single rails are attached to the side walls. In 2021, the original lawn was replaced with synthetic turf, due to constant erosion from the number of commuters. In 2022, a table tennis table was installed just east of the central pathway.

=== Block E (1958–59) ===
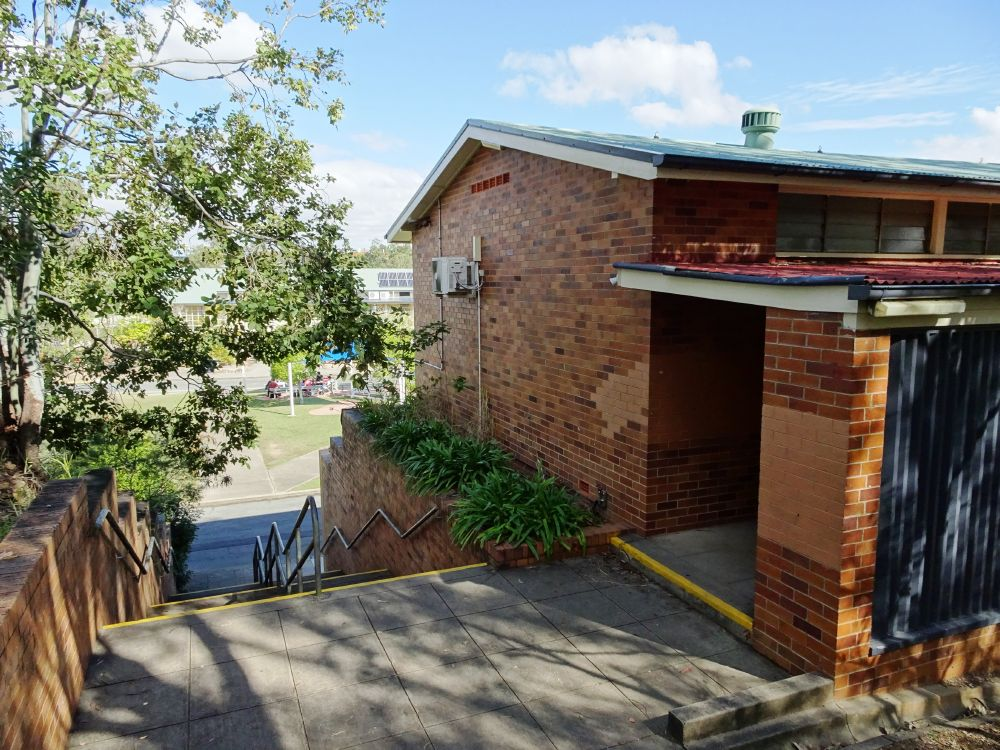
View of staircase adjacent to east end of Block E, looking south, 2016

Block E is a two-storey, timber and brick building, set on an east–west axis, with a corrugated metal-clad gable roof and north-facing verandah. The slope of the site has been cut and retained with a concrete wall to accommodate the building. The first floor, which contains classrooms and a staff room, is supported on lozenge-shaped columns and open-web floor trusses. The building has face brick end walls and ground floor enclosures, and the remaining external walls are clad in chamferboards. Large banks of timber-framed, top-hung awning windows with recent, fixed fanlights above run along the first floor southern facade.

The ground floor slab is elevated above "Town Square" and is accessed along the southern side by concrete steps leading to a central landing with tubular metal balustrades. Concrete pavements and pathways run around a large brick garden bed at the west end of the building to connect with the northern side of the ground floor.

Due to the sloping site, the first floor verandah is at ground level at the eastern end, accessed from the adjacent stairway via a concrete-paved, face brick entrance bay with a vertical timber louvre screen in the northern wall. A timber stair is located at the western end, semi-enclosed with timber-framed, wired-glass screens, with the lower panels coloured in red, yellow and blue. Below the western stair is a landing used as a seating area.

The verandah has a low-pitched roof, set below clerestory windows (glass louvres) and is supported by round metal posts. The floor is timber and the ceiling is lined in flat sheeting with rectangular cover strips. Timber-framed bag racks form the balustrade, and are externally clad in profiled metal sheeting. Windows in the verandah wall are timber-framed double hung sashes, and all doors have been replaced.

The interior of the first floor has walls lined in flat sheeting with rounded cover-strips below dado-level, and ceilings lined in flat sheeting. Early angled hylo-boards with inbuilt cupboards are retained in each of the classrooms. Panelled, two-light interior doors with original hardware connect some of the rooms.

The ground floor comprises toilets at the eastern end, enclosed in face brick walls, and open play space with a concrete pavement floor scored to resemble square pavers, which extends north of the verandah line. The open-web metal trusses are exposed within the ground floor spaces and cantilever over the northern paved area. A timber bench is retained within the central, open play space. A store room is located beneath the far western end of the block, accessed by a boarded timber door. A 1980s brick-enclosed room (formerly a Textiles Room) is not of heritage significance.

=== Block G (1958–59) ===
Block G is a single-storey, brick and timber building, orientated on a north–south axis and standing on a brick base. It is clad in timber chamferboards and has a corrugated metal-clad, shallow pitched gable roof. The building contains a series of rooms of different sizes, including store rooms and a large cooking classroom, linked by a passageway along the western side. Large banks of timber-framed, top-hung awning windows with recent, fixed fanlights above run along the eastern wall, with some windows in the centre blocked off.

The main entrance is via a gable-roofed entrance portico at the southern end. Semi-enclosed by face brick walls, it features a large timber-framed glazed screen in the southern wall, fitted with metal louvres and tall, wired glass panes. The portico contains a short flight of brick stairs with a tubular metal rail balustrade. A secondary entrance is via an open flight of timber stairs, also with a tubular metal rail balustrade, to a covered walkway on the north side, which links Block G with the ground floor level of Block E.

The western passageway has a timber floor and is enclosed by profiled metal-clad bag racks and banks of wired glass louvres. The passageway roof is supported by metal posts, and the flat ceiling is lined with flat sheeting with rounded cover strips. The eastern wall of the passageway is timber-framed with modern fixed glazing above dado level, and banks of vertical glass louvres above. Internal walls and ceilings are lined with flat sheeting. The internal fitout and some partitions and doors are replacements, dating from the 1970s onwards, and are not of heritage significance.

A covered area with a flat roof supported by round metal posts and a concrete pavement floor links the southern end of Block G with Block C's western staircase. A concrete-edged garden bed adjacent to the entrance portico has been modified to accommodate an access ramp. The west wing of Block G, including its connecting link, is not of heritage significance.

=== Driveways (1960–61) ===
The bitumen entrance driveways from McCaul Street (north) and Ward Street (southwest) are edged with concrete curbing. The southwest driveway is partly edged by stone-lined retaining walls as it approaches blocks B and D.

=== Grounds ===
The grounds are well established and contain numerous gardens and mature trees of a wide variety of species, both native and introduced. The steep, northern portion of the grounds retains a native forest area which forms an attractive backdrop to "Town Square" and the northern entrance drive. Remnant patches of tall eucalyptus trees are found throughout the grounds. In the northwestern corner of the school, a yarning circle was constructed for the school's First Nations' students, which is accessible via a short dirt track via J block.

Tennis and basketball courts were located to the west of the 1950s complex up until 2021, when the area was repurposed for a multi-purpose hall (designed to hold all 2000+ students at a time). On the low-lying, flat southern grounds are a large Sports Oval (c. 1959) at the western end and open playing fields to the east, both fringed by mature trees. A low metal gate with lettering "I S H S" was located at the north end of the oval, however was removed.

== Heritage listing ==
Indooroopilly State High School was listed on the Queensland Heritage Register on 14 October 2016 having satisfied the following criteria.

The place is important in demonstrating the evolution or pattern of Queensland's history.

Indooroopilly State High School (established in 1954) is important in demonstrating the evolution of state education and its associated architecture in Queensland. The place retains excellent, representative examples of standard government designs (constructed 1953–59) that were architectural responses to prevailing government educational philosophies, set in landscaped grounds with sporting facilities.

It is important in demonstrating the pattern of provision of secondary education, on new sites with expanded facilities, across Queensland in the 1950s, a time of enormous growth.

The layout of the classroom blocks, the covered links between them and associated open spaces, reflect the mid-1950s introduction of organic master planning, which responded to the site contours and provided for ordered growth from a nucleus.

Blocks A and B incorporate Boulton & Paul timber units, which demonstrate the introduction and adoption of imported prefabricated systems by the Queensland Government in response to acute building material shortages and population growth in the post-World War II period.

Blocks A, D and E incorporate structural systems (timber trusses Block A, steel open-web trusses blocks D and E) that illustrate the evolution of Department of Public Works designs during the mid to late 1950s to allow for unimpeded play space under highset timber school buildings.

Blocks C, D and E illustrate the adaptation of standard Department of Public Works designs to suit the specific site conditions and functional requirements of Queensland schools from the 1950s.

The school's built landscape elements, including stairs, pathways, planter boxes, and pavements, illustrate the introduction of new ideas about integrating buildings and functional areas with their setting, and demonstrates the evolution of landscaping design at Queensland schools during the 1950s and 60s.

The place is important in demonstrating the principal characteristics of a particular class of cultural places.

Indooroopilly State High School is important in demonstrating the principal characteristics of a Queensland state high school of the 1950s. These include its master-planned site incorporating long, narrow buildings, linked around open-ended courtyard spaces; and generous, landscaped grounds with shade trees, assembly and sports areas.

Demonstrating organic 1950s site planning principles, the core of the school retains its asymmetrical layout of long, narrow classroom blocks arranged organically to follow the contours of the site, form courtyard spaces and achieve ideal solar orientation.

The Boulton & Paul classrooms of blocks A and B are good, intact examples of their type, and clearly demonstrate the characteristics of prefabricated construction methods through the expression of their modular construction of 4-foot (1.2 m) wide wall panels. Other characteristic features of this type include: a gable roof; a verandah for circulation, with glazed screens at the ends; standard classroom size of 24 by 24 feet (7.3 by 7.3 m), and large banks of timber-framed windows to maximise natural light and ventilation.

The buildings with timber floor trusses (Block A) and open-web steel floor trusses (blocks D and E) demonstrate two iterations of standard Department of Public Works' structural systems that were introduced in the 1950s to provide unimpeded play space beneath classrooms. The buildings incorporate good, intact examples of their structural type and the visibility of the trusses is retained.

The upper classroom levels of blocks C, D and E are good, intact examples of a standard Department of Public Work timber school building type. Characteristic features of this type include: a verandah for circulation, with glazed screens at the ends; large banks of timber-framed windows, to maximise natural light and ventilation; clerestory lighting above the verandah roof; and 24-foot (7.3 m) wide classrooms.

Building A6, Block G and the west end of Block B are good examples of purpose-designed buildings that were constructed, where required, to meet the specific functional and spatial needs of schools. Originally designed to accommodate drawing (Building A6), domestic science (Block G) and the principal's office (west end of Block B), these buildings remain largely intact and are an integral part of the 1950s master plan.

The intact built landscape elements, including brick planter boxes, concrete stairs and pavements, bitumen roadways and parade ground, retaining walls and gardens, demonstrate the innovative landscaping concepts of the 1950s, which sought to improve the functionality and aesthetics of school playground designs.

The place has a strong or special association with a particular community or cultural group for social, cultural or spiritual reasons.

Schools have always played an important part in Queensland communities. They typically retain significant and enduring connections with former pupils, parents, and teachers; provide a venue for social interaction and volunteer work; and are a source of pride, symbolising local progress and aspirations.

Indooroopilly State High School has a strong and ongoing association with the surrounding community. It was established in 1954 and generations of students from Brisbane's western suburbs have been taught there. The place is important for its contribution to the educational development of Indooroopilly and as a focus for the community.

== See also ==
- History of state education in Queensland
- List of schools in Greater Brisbane
