= NAPLAN =

Australia's national school assessment program

National Assessment Program – Literacy and Numeracy
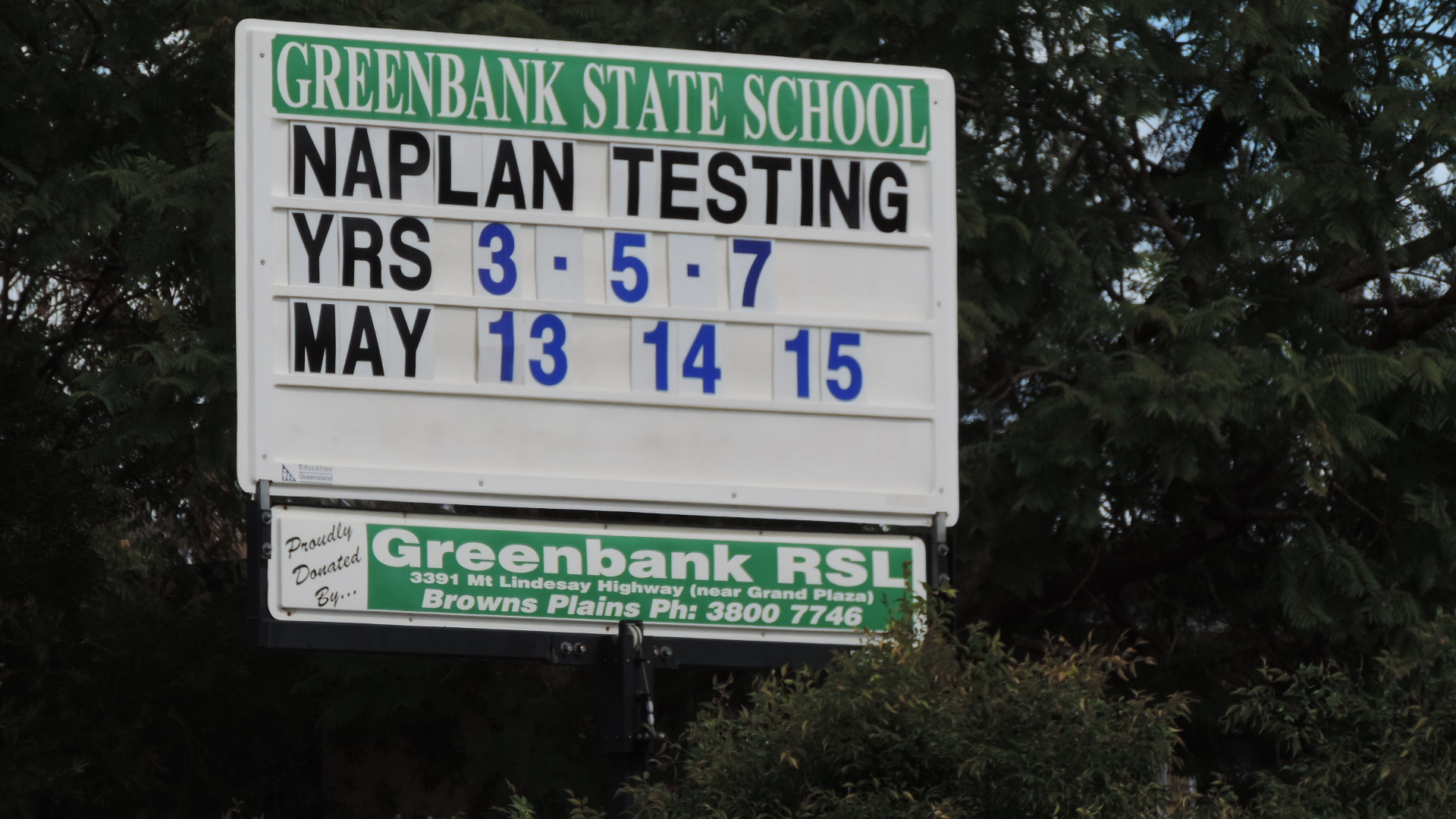
- Sign announcing tests, Greenbank State School, 2014
- Acronym: NAPLAN
- Type: Standardised national assessment test
- Administrator: Australian Curriculum, Assessment and Reporting Authority
- Skills tested: Numeracy and literacy
- Purpose: To provide a snapshot of students' current reading, writing, language and numeracy skills, and compare individual student performance against national standards.
- Year started: 2008
- Offered: Once a year
- Regions: Australia
- Languages: English
- Used by: Schools (Year 3, 5, 7 and 9)
- Website: nap.edu.au/naplan

The National Assessment Program – Literacy and Numeracy (NAPLAN) is a standardised test in Australia that assesses students’ reading, writing, language, and numeracy skills. It is designed to assess the ability of students relative to their year group at a national level. This test is carried out annually to primary and secondary school students in Year 3, 5, 7 and 9.

NAPLAN is administered by the Australian Curriculum, Assessment and Reporting Authority (ACARA). The National Assessment Program is overseen by the Education Ministers Meeting.

NAPLAN was introduced in 2008 by the Rudd Labor government, supported by Julia Gillard acting as then education minister. ACARA has managed the tests from 2010 onwards. The tests are designed to determine if Australian students are achieving outcomes. There has been a great deal of contention in the educational community as to whether the tests are appropriate, whether teachers are teaching as they normally would or teaching to the test, and what the results of the test are being used for. The data obtained from the NAPLAN tests are collated and used to show all schools' average performance against other schools in the country on the Government My School website.

The tests are also designed to be carried out on the same days all across Australia in any given year. Parents are able to decide whether their children take the test or not. The vast majority of Year 3, 5, 7 and 9 students participate.

The NAPLAN tests for 2020 were cancelled on 20 March 2020 due to "widespread disruption to schools" caused by the COVID-19 pandemic in Australia.

In November 2023, a review commissioned by the West Australian teachers' union recommended that NAPLAN should be scrapped in favour of the Programme for International Student Assessment (PISA).

== Background ==
Prior to the introduction of NAPLAN the testing of literacy and numeracy was done individually by each jurisdiction. According to New South Wales Public Schools the NAPLAN tests, which commenced in 2008, were instigated after the Ministerial Council on Education, Employment, Training and Youth Affairs (MCEETYA) determined that "national testing in literacy and numeracy would proceed for the full cohort of students in years 3, 5, 7 and 9 from 2008 onward". The NAPLAN tests would be used to determine if students were performing either above, at or below the National Minimum Standard in the areas of reading, language conventions, writing and numeracy skills for their particular year level. The emergence of a national schooling system in Australia is part of a shift towards making educational policy part of national economic policy in response to globalization.

According to ACARA the main purpose of the NAPLAN tests is to measure whether literacy and numeracy skills and knowledge that provide the critical foundation for other learning and for their productive and rewarding participation in the community. In essence the Ministerial Council on Education, Employment, Training and Youth Affairs (MCEETYA) influence brought about a series of tests to determine whether students being prepared for later life appropriately in the present day school system. The introduction of national literacy and numeracy tests in 2008 has provided consistency, comparability and transferability of information on students' literacy and numeracy performance..

=== Stakeholders ===
External videos
- What is NAPLAN
- Why NAPLAN is valuable

The primary stakeholders are students, parents and teachers. According to a Parent's Brochure the NAPLAN test results will be used to assist students and parents in discussing student progress with teachers, identifying students who require "greater challenges or additional support", identifying teaching program strengths and weaknesses and allow for school program review and support".

== Development ==
The development of the NAP tests began in 1999 when the Australian ministers of education worked together to produce the Adelaide declaration on national goals for schooling in the 21st century which sought to make all young Australian successful learners, confident and creative individuals and active and informed citizens.

ACARA claims in their MySchool fact sheet that "processes have been put in place to ensure that NAPLAN is a valid and reliable measurement of students' literacy and numeracy ability". It further goes on to state that "NAPLAN has a number of purposes including reporting national and jurisdictional achievements in literacy and numeracy as well as providing accurate and reliable measures of student and school performance. These purposes are carefully considered during the NAPLAN development process".

The development of the test includes input from indigenous experts from around the country to ensure the tests are designed to be inclusive of all students. Intense community pressure on school performance has led to the growth of a test preparation industry.

Each test, which are now done online using a program called the NAP Locked Down Browser, contains between 30 and 40 questions. Historically, most students completed the tests by using a pencil and paper. In Victoria, Pearson Australia has been responsible for collecting NAPLAN data and marking some tests. In Queensland the printing and distribution of tests, data collection and some marking was undertaken by Fuji Xerox Document Management Solutions which also processes tests from South Australia.

In 2016, some schools trialled online testing. In 2018 around 200,000 students sat online versions of the tests. It had been claimed that results from both styles of test would be able to be accurately compared, but doubts about that claim led to a delay in the release of preliminary results on the scheduled date of 8 August. Concern was expressed about delays in announcing results reducing their usefulness.

== Analysis and evaluation ==
"...at a national level we are seeing little change in student achievement in these important areas of learning."

— Robert Randall, Chief Executive Officer, ACARA,

The tests are not a high stakes event in a student's education. It is a snapshot of a student's current abilities. The tests do not measure higher-order thinking skills or creativity. NAPLAN is a tool intended to be used for school improvement.

Data from NAPLAN is modelled according to the item response theory. This allows for comparisons to be made between tests, a process known as equating.

=== Validity and reliability ===
The down side of NAPLAN can be seen when teachers are teaching to the test rather than teaching to the curriculum as can be seen in Victoria where according to Perkins (2010) teachers have been told to "teach explicitly for the national tests that are the cornerstone of the Federal Government's controversial My School website".

NAPLAN is also valid in that "special provisions which typically will reflect the support normally provided in the classroom may be provided to students with disabilities or special needs".

The Validity and Reliability in Quality Assessment in relation to NAPLAN can be summed up by ACARA in that they use an equating process to "provide a high level of assurance as to the reliability of comparisons between years" and that this process ensures that "any test difference has been taken into account before making statements about one year's results compared to the next".

=== Flexibility and fairness ===
On the point of fairness it is important not to just rate the fairness of the test itself but to also rate the procedure of giving the test as well. Apart from the fact that the test is given mid-year so not all learning may have been successfully completed as would be expected by the end of the year for that particular grade, writes that Queensland Teachers Union president Steve Ryan said some schools "probably have devoted too much time to NAPLAN".

Although the test itself is extremely fair in that all students perform the same test nationwide, it also does not seem to take into account the fact that students in schools don't just comprise the average but also include the likes of students in special education. ACARA points out that "Students can be exempted from one or more NAPLAN tests if they have significant intellectual or functional disability or if they are from a non-English-speaking background and arrived in Australia less than one year before the tests". It is understood therefore that NAPLAN is designed to test Literacy and Numeracy levels in students considered to be normal. There is also the consideration to be given to the fact that selective schools can pick and choose which students attend their schools giving them unfair advantage in attaining higher scores in almost any national assessment and especially in NAPLAN.

=== Authenticity ===
As far as authenticity is concerned in the NAPLAN tests there are elements of real-world application and there are elements that are not real-world. One of the important points to consider however with the NAPLAN tests is that, especially in relation to numeracy, not all areas can have immediately foreseeable real-world application however that does not necessarily mean that the questions are unimportant. For the most part, the NAPLAN tests do seem to have quite a bit of real-world authenticity about them.

== Results ==
Year	Band	National minimum standard
3	1 to 6	2
5	3 to 8	4
7	4 to 9	5
9	5 to 10	6
Source: National Minimum Standards

The NAPLAN Data Service identify areas of strength or weakness within a school or classroom. At the classroom level, the Item Analysis Report, the Writing Criteria Report and (for numeracy in particular) the Assessment Area Report provide powerful diagnostic information which can be used to complement school assessment and to inform the planning of teaching and learning programs. Reports are usually delivered in September. Each student tested receives a student report. Schools receive detailed results as to how each student answered individual questions, but do not have access to what the questions were. The tests provide an indication, not a fine grading, of a student's performance. Parents are only given general feedback as to which percentile band their children are in for each type of test. ACARA does not provide the magnitude of the measurement error or the imprecision of the tests.

On average in almost all NAPLAN tests home-schooled students perform better than students who attend schools. Some schools, particularly small ones, are reporting such significant changes in year to year results that the results are meaningless.

The data from NAPLAN is collated onto the MySchool website. The Australian Primary Principals Association does not support the publication of results in a way that allows for easy intra-school comparisons. The results are graded along a series of ten bands based on achieving complex solutions to questions and spanning all age groups. Data analysis packages are available to schools. Some schools are using the results from NAPLAN on an individual basis when making decisions regarding enrolment. Tests results are directly linked to federal funding agreements with the states.

The delay between testing and the release of results has been criticised for taking too long to be useful within the same year. The test results have shown that since 2008 Year 3 students have gained at reading, grammar and writing skills. They have also revealed that improvements in spelling and numeracy were achieved by Year 5 students while the writing skills of Year 7 and 9 students have declined.

== Availability of past tests ==
The 2012–2016 test are available.

The 2008–2011 tests are available, copies are also available from The Wayback Machine.

== See also ==
- Education in Australia
- Grading systems by country
