= MCEETYA =

The Ministerial Council on Education, Employment, Training and Youth Affairs (MCEETYA) was formed in June 1993, when the Council of Australian Governments (COAG) amalgamated with a number of ministerial councils to optimise the co-ordination of policy making across related portfolios. Three previously existing councils were merged, the Australian Education Council (AEC), the Council of Ministers of Vocational Education, Employment and Training (MOVEET), and the Youth Ministers Council (YMC), to form MCEETYA.

In July 2009 the Ministerial Council for Education, Early Childhood Development and Youth Affairs (MCEECDYA) was established following agreement of the Council of Australian Governments (COAG) to a realignment of the roles and responsibilities of two previously existing councils— MCEETYA and the Ministerial Council for Vocational and Technical Education (MCVTE).

This decision resulted in the formation of two new Councils—MCEECDYA and the Ministerial Council for Tertiary Education and Employment (MCTEE).

== Membership ==
Membership of the MCEECDYA comprises State, Territory, Australian Government and New Zealand Ministers with responsibility for the portfolios of school education, early childhood development and youth affairs, with Papua New Guinea, Norfolk Island and East Timor having observer status
