= Australian Curriculum, Assessment and Reporting Authority =

Independent statutory authority

Agency overview
- Formed: December 2008
- Jurisdiction: Australia
- Headquarters: Sydney, Australia
- Employees: 97 (2023)
- Annual budget: A$34.995 million (2024–25)
- Agency executive: Stephen Gniel, Chief Executive Officer
- Parent department: Department of Education (Australia)
- Website: www.acara.edu.au

The Australian Curriculum, Assessment and Reporting Authority (ACARA) is the independent statutory authority responsible for the development of a national curriculum, a national assessment program, and a national data collection and reporting program that supports learning for Australian students.

ACARA's work is carried out in collaboration with a wide range of stakeholders, including teachers, principals, governments, state and territory education authorities, professional education associations, community groups and the general public. It was established by the Australian Curriculum, Assessment and Reporting Authority Act 2008 (No. 136 (Cth)). The authority is also responsible for the My School website and NAPLAN testing.
