= My School =

School

- Website type: School performance monitoring
- Available in: English
- Owner: Australian Curriculum, Assessment and Reporting Authority
- Website: myschool.edu.au
- Commercial: No
- Launched: 28 January 2010; 16 years ago
- Current status: Online

My School is a website administered by the Australian Curriculum, Assessment and Reporting Authority (ACARA) which provides access to information about Australian schools. Nearly 10,000 schools across Australia can be searched.

The site reports data from the annual National Assessment Program – Literacy and Numeracy (NAPLAN) tests which compulsorily assess reading, writing, spelling, grammar, punctuation, and numeracy at years 3, 5, 7 and 9 for all Australian school students. It also displays information such as school missions, staffing, financial information, its resources and its students' characteristics.

The website does not allow users to directly compare schools of their choosing.

== Launch ==
The website went live at 1:00 am on 28 January 2010, but later in the morning the website became unavailable due to extremely high demand. It was launched by the then Minister for Education, Julia Gillard.

== Update ==
An update to the site was expected in December 2010, however its roll-out was delayed until March 2011. The primary aim of the changes was to increase funding transparency.

== Opposition ==
Teachers' unions and some parent bodies have expressed concerns that the data is being used to formulate league tables of schools. Principals claim that students have been asked to leave some schools because their performance on NAPLAN tests was expected to damage those schools' rankings. Independent think tank the Grattan Institute calls for schools to be judged on the individual improvement students make every year rather than the comparison based on raw test scores used on My School. The Australian Education Union has resolved to boycott future NAPLAN testing if the My School website is used in this way.

== See also ==
- Education in Australia
