= Deep clean (COVID-19) =

Sanitation to prevent the spread of COVID-19

A deep clean, in the context of the COVID-19 pandemic, is a sanitation technology. It can mean different things, depending on the industry or jurisdiction. For example, the UK NHS care home guidelines differ from the US CDC recommendations on "How to clean and disinfect". The EPA has created a COVID-specific webpage on which are listed disease-specific pesticidal disinfectants, and has created a webpage on "GUIDANCE FOR CLEANING AND DISINFECTING" in the context of the April 2020 plan, "Opening Up America Again".

In certain jurisdictions, a deep clean must be performed by staff "whom have been trained in the use of appropriate personal protective equipment (PPE)".

== Industry-specific ==
=== Airlines ===
By Mid-March 2020, Delta Air Lines had developed a fogging procedure to "spray a mist of disinfectant on surfaces throughout the cabin on all trans-Pacific flights arriving in the U.S. and flights from Italy landing in certain American airports. It plans to extend the procedure, its website says, to trans-Atlantic flights coming from areas with reported cases of COVID-19."

Southwest Airlines said in March 2020 that it "now uses a hospital-grade disinfectant throughout the plane during overnight cleaning instead of its former practice of using that only in select areas like the restroom."

=== Cruise lines ===
Carnival Cruises had instituted a night-time "deep-cleaning and disinfection [procedure] is conducted utilizing electro-static applications through specialized machines in highly-trafficked public areas (including all restaurants, the fitness center, spa, lido deck areas, promenade, casino, medical center, public restrooms, lounges, bars, lobbies, elevators, atrium, youth activity centers, arcade and all crew public areas)."
