= Citipointe =

Citipointe may refer to:

- Citipointe Christian College, a school in Brisbane, Australia
- Citipointe Church, Brisbane, Australia

== See also ==
- Christian Outreach College (disambiguation), the former name of several schools, including Citipointe
- City Point (disambiguation)
