= Christian Outreach College =

Australian schools which were formerly referred to as Christian Outreach College (COC) through their affiliation with the Christian Outreach Centre (now International Network of Churches), include:

- Citipointe Christian College, formerly Christian Outreach College Brisbane
- Highlands Christian College, formerly Christian Outreach College Toowoomba
- Suncoast Christian College, formerly Suncoast Christian Outreach College, at Woombye on the Sunshine Coast, Queensland

== See also ==
- Riverside Christian College, formerly Maryborough Christian Academy at the Maryborough Christian Outreach Centre
