= HESA =

HESA may refer to:

- Hisyah, an alternative name for a town in Syria
- Iran Aircraft Manufacturing Industrial Company, an Iranian aircraft manufacturer
- Higher Education South Africa, an association of universities in South Africa
- Higher Education Statistics Agency, a statistics-collection agency in the United Kingdom
- Higher Education Support Act 2003, an Australian Act of Parliament relating to the funding of higher education that came into effect on 1 January 2005
- Harvard Extension Student Association, a student government organization for Harvard Extension School
