= List of universities in Australia by enrollment =

This is a comprehensive list of all universities in Australia by total university enrolment. The data is gathered from the Department of Education and Training Higher Education statistics from 2016. For accuracy of comparison, all data is measured in Equivalent Full-Time Student Load (EFTSL) except for "Total Students".

== National universities ==
University Name	Postgraduate - EFTSL		Undergraduate - EFTSL		Non-Award - EFTSL		All Students - EFTSL (Rank)	Total Students (Rank)
Australian Catholic University	2,804	11.5%	21,169	86.5%	485	2.0%	24,458 (16)	32,915 (20)

== Australian Capital Territory ==
University Name	Postgraduate - EFTSL		Undergraduate - EFTSL		Non-Award - EFTSL		All Students - EFTSL (Rank)	Total Students (Rank)
The Australian National University	7,450	44.1%	9,388	55.5%	69	0.4%	16,908 (27)	23,571 (28)
University of Canberra	2,099	17.9%	9,358	79.8%	268	2.3%	11,724 (32)	17,046 (33)

== New South Wales ==
University Name	Postgraduate - EFTSL		Undergraduate - EFTSL		Non-Award - EFTSL		All Students - EFTSL (Rank)	Total Students (Rank)
Charles Sturt University	6,659	29.5%	15,196	67.4%	703	3.1%	22,557 (13)	42,923 (19)
Macquarie University	6,187	19.8%	24,536	78.3%	605	1.9%	31,327 (13)	42,753 (14)
Southern Cross University	1,614	16.6%	7,631	78.3%	498	5.1%	9,743 (35)	15,723 (34)
The University of New England	2,714	23.8%	8,357	73.4%	316	2.8%	11,386 (33)	21,789 (30)
The University of New South Wales	11,856	28.3%	29,373	70.2%	615	1.5%	41,844 (5)	56,090 (5)
The University of Newcastle	3,873	16.2%	18,204	76.2%	1,813	7.6%	23,890 (18)	34,601 (17)
The University of Sydney	17,863	37.9%	28,873	61.2%	431	0.9%	47,167 (4)	61,224 (4)
University of Technology, Sydney	7,757	24.1%	23,387	72.6%	1076	3.3%	32,218 (12)	43,163 (12)
University of Wollongong	5,196	20.7%	19,189	76.7%	644	2.6%	25,029 (15)	32,981 (19)
Western Sydney University	4,382	13.1%	28,089	84.4%	824	2.5%	33,294 (11)	44,383 (11)|-

== Northern Territory ==
University Name	Postgraduate - EFTSL		Undergraduate - EFTSL		Non-Award - EFTSL		All Students - EFTSL (Rank)	Total Students (Rank)
Charles Darwin University	1,360	20.7%	4,654	70.8%	560	8.5%	6,573 (38)	11,825 (38)

== Queensland ==
University Name	Postgraduate - EFTSL		Undergraduate - EFTSL		Non-Award - EFTSL		All Students - EFTSL (Rank)	Total Students (Rank)
Bond University	2,130	37.7%	2,951	52.3%	562	10.0%	5,645 (39)	6,089 (39)
Central Queensland University	3,799	27.6%	9,002	65.3%	974	7.1%	13,774 (31)	21,702 (31)
Griffith University	6,435	19.1%	26,749	79.3%	541	1.6%	33,725 (10)	46,503 (10)
James Cook University	2,672	17.3%	12,291	79.5%	492	3.2%	15,456 (29)	21,333 (32)
Queensland University of Technology	6,264	17.3%	29,603	81.9%	303	0.8%	36,168 (8)	48,823 (9)
The University of Queensland	10,042	25.0%	29,607	73.6%	566	1.4%	40,214 (6)	51,071 (7)
University of Southern Queensland	3,065	21.0%	10,258	70.5%	1,235	8.5%	14,557 (30)	27,078 (24)
University of the Sunshine Coast	992	10.1%	8,023	82.0%	775	7.9%	9,788 (34)	14,502 (35)

== South Australia ==
University Name	Postgraduate - EFTSL		Undergraduate - EFTSL		Non-Award - EFTSL		All Students - EFTSL (Rank)	Total Students (Rank)
Flinders University	4,785	28.0%	11,885	69.7%	386	2.3%	17,056 (26)	24,850 (27)
Torrens University Australia	965	31.4%	2,110	68.6%	0	0.0%	3,075 (40)	5,218 (40)
The University of Adelaide	5,057	23.6%	16,187	75.4%	211	1.0%	21,453 (21)	27,199 (23)
University of South Australia	3,652	16.4%	17,763	79.8%	853	3.8%	22,269 (20)	31,394 (21)

== Tasmania ==
University Name	Postgraduate - EFTSL		Undergraduate - EFTSL		Non-Award - EFTSL		All Students - EFTSL (Rank)	Total Students (Rank)
University of Tasmania	3,390	16.2%	16,669	79.6%	884	4.2%	20,943 (22)	34,571 (18)

== Victoria ==
University Name	Postgraduate - EFTSL		Undergraduate - EFTSL		Non-Award - EFTSL		All Students - EFTSL (Rank)	Total Students (Rank)
Deakin University	7,826	20.8%	29,650	78.7%	189	0.5%	37,665 (7)	52,926 (6)
Federation University Australia	2,574	26.5%	6,969	71.7%	174	1.8%	9,717 (36)	14,019 (36)
La Trobe University	5,474	19.0%	23,170	80.4%	181	0.6%	28,824 (14)	37,056 (16)
Monash University	15,161	25.7%	43,636	73.9%	239	0.4%	59,036 (1)	73,807 (1)
RMIT University	8,182	17.3%	38,694	81.7%	460	1.0%	47,336 (3)	61,882 (3)
The University of Melbourne	23,314	48.5%	24,444	50.9%	313	0.6%	48,072 (2)	61,938 (2)
Swinburne University of Technology	3,844	15.8%	20,372	83.7%	129	0.5%	24,345 (17)	39,181 (15)
University of Divinity	404	56.7%	309	43.3%	0	0.0%	713 (41)	1,608 (41)
Victoria University	2,771	14.2%	16,275	83.6%	428	2.2%	19,473 (24)	27,001 (25)

== Western Australia ==
University Name	Postgraduate - EFTSL		Undergraduate - EFTSL		Non-Award - EFTSL		All Students - EFTSL (Rank)	Total Students (Rank)
Curtin University	5,415	15.5%	28,197	80.5%	1,392	4.0%	35,002 (9)	50,205 (8)
Edith Cowan University	3,993	21.9%	13,344	73.0%	931	5.1%	18,267 (25)	28,117 (22)
Murdoch University	1,912	12.2%	13,222	84.4%	531	3.4%	15,665 (28)	23,143 (29)
The University of Notre Dame Australia	843	9.1%	7,719	83.2%	710	7.7%	9,273 (37)	12,022 (37)
University of Western Australia	6,691	34.2%	12,818	65.5%	56	0.3%	19,565 (23)	25,200 (26)

== Largest universities ==
=== By all students ===
==== By EFTSL ====
Rank	University	All Students - EFTSL (2016)
1.	Monash University (Victoria)	59,036
2.	The University of Melbourne (Victoria)	48,072
3.	RMIT University (Victoria)	47,336
4.	The University of Sydney (New South Wales)	47,167
5.	The University of New South Wales (New South Wales)	41,844

==== By enrolments ====
Rank	University	All Students - Enrolments (2016)
1.	Monash University (Victoria)	73,807
2.	The University of Melbourne (Victoria)	61,938
3.	RMIT University (Victoria)	61,882
4.	The University of Sydney (New South Wales)	61,224
5.	The University of New South Wales (New South Wales)	56,090

=== By undergraduate students ===
Rank	University	Undergraduate - EFTSL (2016)
1.	Monash University (Victoria)	43,636
2.	RMIT University (Victoria)	38,694
3.	Deakin University (Victoria)	29,650
4.	The University of Queensland (Queensland)	29,607
5.	Queensland University of Technology (Queensland)	29,603

Rank	University	Undergraduate - % of Total (2016)
1.	Australian Catholic University (Multi-State)	86.55%
2.	Murdoch University (Western Australia)	84.4%
3.	Western Sydney University (New South Wales)	84.37%
4.	Swinburne University of Technology (Victoria)	83.68%
5.	Victoria University (Victoria)	83.58%

=== By postgraduate students ===
Rank	University	Postgraduate - EFTSL (2016)
1.	The University of Melbourne (Victoria)	23,314
2.	The University of Sydney (New South Wales)	17,863
3.	Monash University (Victoria)	15,161
4.	The University of New South Wales (New South Wales)	11,856
5.	The University of Queensland (Queensland)	10,042

Rank	University	Postgraduate - % of Total (2016)
1.	University of Divinity (Victoria)	56.66%
2.	The University of Melbourne (Victoria)	48.50%
3.	The Australian National University (Australian Capital Territory)	44.06%
4.	The University of Sydney (New South Wales)	37.87%
5.	Bond University (Queensland)	37.73%

== See also ==
- List of Australian universities by annual revenue
- List of universities in Australia
