= Christian Heritage College =

Christian Heritage College may refer to:

- Christian Heritage College, Brisbane, Australia
- San Diego Christian College
