= Alberto Campbell-Staines =

Jamaican-Australian athlete

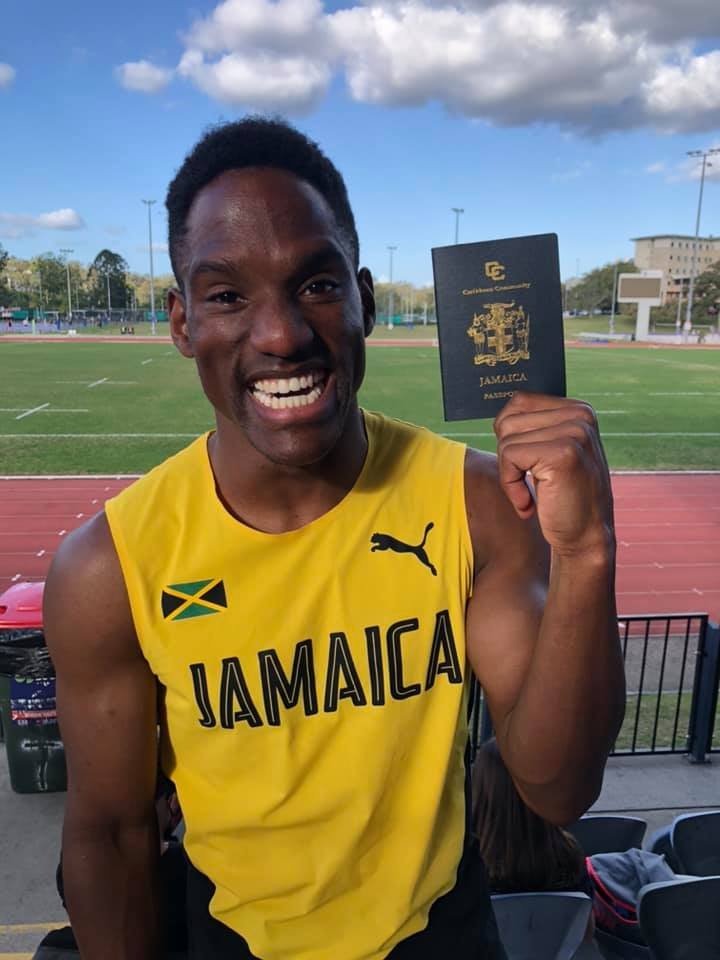

Personal information
- Full name: Alberto Jonathan Campbell-Staines
- Nationality: Australia Jamaica
- Born: 27 June 1993 (age 33) Kingston, Jamaica
- Education: Citipointe Christian College
- Height: 159 cm (5 ft 3 in)
- Weight: 64 kg (141 lb)
Medal record
Athletics (T20)
INAS Athletics World Championships
Bronze medal – third place	2013 Prague	Men's 400 m
Bronze medal – third place	2013 Prague	Men's 4 x 400 m Relay

Alberto Jonathan Campbell-Staines (born 27 June 1993) is an Australian athlete with an intellectual disability who competes in the T20 classification. He won two bronze medals at the 9th INAS Athletics World Championships.

== Personal ==
Campbell was born in Kingston, Jamaica on 27 June 1993. He was born prematurely and at three months was sent to the state-run orphanage in Kingston, where he suffered from neglect and malnutrition. At the age of five, he was transferred to the Salvation Army orphanage The Nest. He has an intellectual impairment that has made learning difficult. At the orphanage in grade one he was taught by Julie-Anne Staines, a teacher from Australia, who with her husband Paul decided to adopt Campbell at the age of nine in 2002. His adoption and Australian citizenship process was long and difficult. The family returned to Australia from Jamaica in September 2003 with Campbell entering on a tourist visa after an adoption visa denied. The family flew to New Zealand in December 2004 to be granted his permanent residency adoption visa, and he became an Australian citizen in 2006. The family took the adoption visa case to High Court. In Brisbane, he attended the Citipointe Christian College. In 2015, he works as a Primary Teacher's Assistant at Citipointe Christian College.

== Athletics career ==
Campbell became serious about his running at the age of twelve and joined the QE2 Track Club where he was coached by Annette Rice. He competed at the 2011 Australian Junior AWD Championship and finished 1st in the 400m and 2nd in the 100m and 200m in the under20 age group. At the 2012 Australian Open, AWD & Combined Events Championships he was the only sprinter to enter in all three sprint events and the only one to make it to the final in each event.

In 2013, he competed at the 9th INAS World Athletics Championships in Prague, Czech Republic where he won bronze medals in the Men's 400m and Men's 4 × 400 m relay. In the 400 m, he ran a personal best time of 49.73 and the Men's 4 × 400 m broke the Australian record. In 2015, at the Queensland Combined Events Championships, he ran 50.45. In March 2015, at the IPC Athletics Grand Prix, which was part of the Queensland Athletics Championships, he won the Men's 400 m Ambulant in 50.28. He won the Men's 400 m Ambulant at the 2015 Australian Championships. Competing at the IPC Athletics Grand Prix that was part of the 2015 Italian Championships, he finished second in the Men's 400 m T20. He will also be competing in the 2020 Paralympics, in August 2021. This time Alberto will be competing for Jamaica.

Campbell-Staines has on his bedroom wall Eric Liddell's famous words ""I believe that God made me for a purpose, but He also made me fast. When I run, I feel His pleasure". After his success at the World Championships, he said ""I worship God when I run. He is the one who made me fast. I always thank him after races, whether I win or lose, I run for God".

At the 2015 IPC Athletics World Championships in Doha, he qualified for the final of the Men's 400m T20 with a time of 51.94 but he did not start in the final.

In 2015, he is a Queensland Academy of Sport scholarship holder and is aiming to compete at the 2016 Rio Paralympics where the Men's 400 m T20 is on the athletics program.

In 2021 he represented Jamaica in the Tokyo 2020 Paralympic Games.
