= Christian Heritage College (Australia) =

Higher education provider

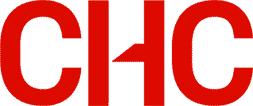

Christian Heritage College (CHC) is a Christian higher education provider based in the Brisbane suburb of Carindale in Australia. It is governed by the Christian Heritage College Council, which is appointed by the National Executive of the International Network of Churches (INC), the parent company of the college.

The college was founded in 1986 by Christian Outreach Centre Australia, trading as INC, as a Christian teachers' college. In 2004 it was approved by the Commonwealth government as higher education provider under the Higher Education Support Act 2003 .

CHC offers over 25 courses at diploma, bachelor, and postgraduate. Students can also study externally, by distance. CHC offers courses in five study areas - business, education, liberal arts, ministry and social sciences. The college and its courses are accredited by the Tertiary Education Quality and Standards Agency, which regulates the Australian higher education sector.

The "Citipointe Campus" includes:

- the college;
- Citipointe Church (formerly Christian Outreach Centre);
- a primary and secondary school (Citipointe Christian College);
- Citipointe Christian College International (ELICOS Centre);
- a Bible college (Citipointe Ministry College);
- a daycare centre (Citipointe Child Care).
