= List of universities in Australia =

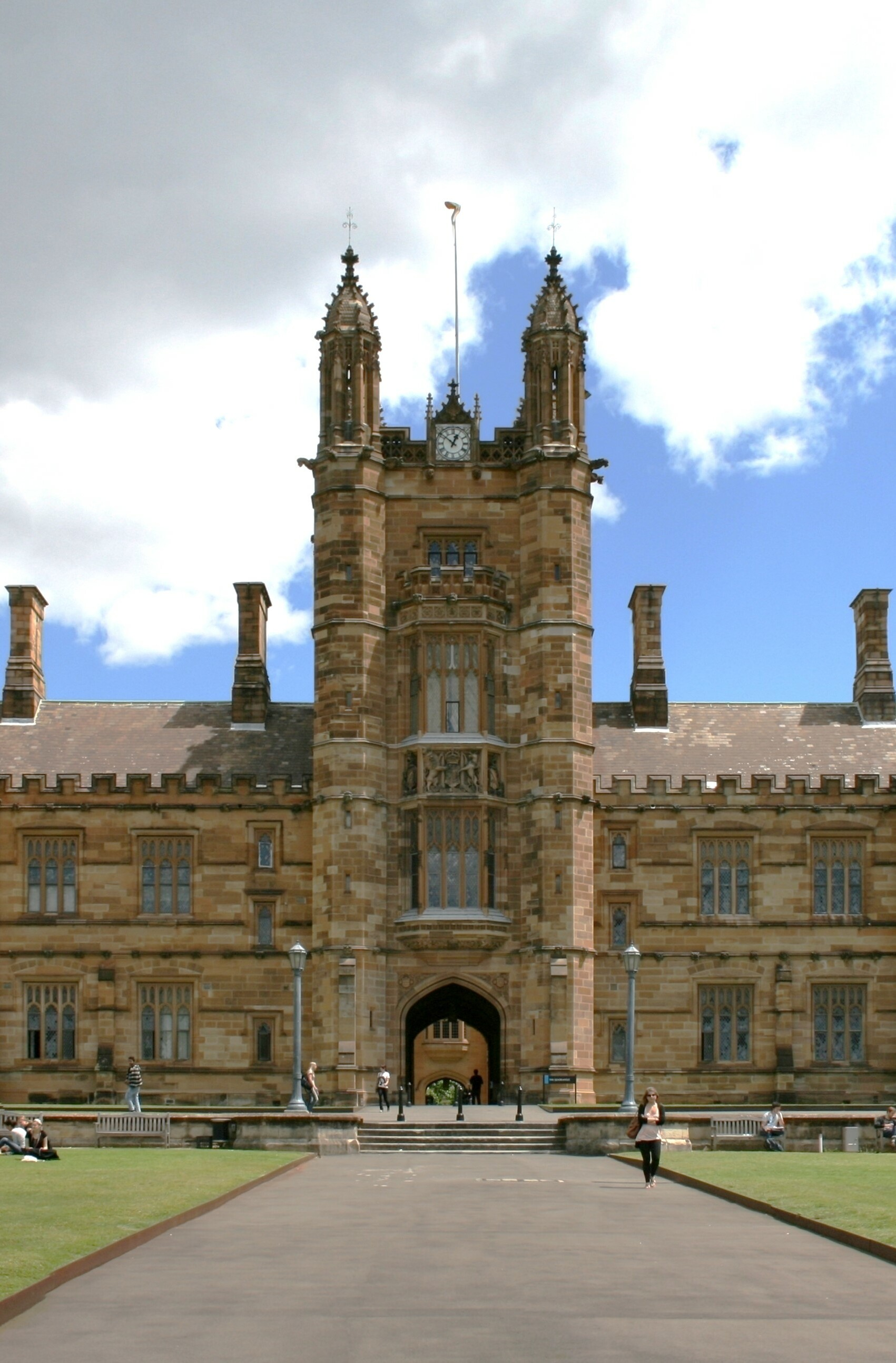
The University of Sydney, established in 1850, is the oldest university in Australia.

There are 44 universities in Australia out of which 39 are public universities and 5 private universities. The Commonwealth Higher Education Support Act 2003 sets out three groups of Australian higher education providers: universities, other self-accrediting higher education institutions and state and territory accredited higher education institutions.

For admissions to universities, those students who have completed Australian state curricula are granted a state-specific Australian Tertiary Admission Rank. All Australian universities use the ATAR based "selection rank" as one of their methods of admission; universities also use past study, work experience and other considerations in granting admission. The ATAR provides an indication of the overall position of the student in relation to the student body for that year across the state. The ATAR is used by state-specific centralised admission centres for admission into university. The following bodies allocate ATAR based selection ranks and admission for the tertiary institutions in their respective states:

- Universities Admissions Centre (UAC) in New South Wales and the Australian Capital Territory, with a separate website for Tasmania
- South Australian Tertiary Admissions Centre (SATAC) in South Australia and the Northern Territory
- Victorian Tertiary Admissions Centre (VTAC) in Victoria
- Tertiary Institutions Service Centre (TISC) in Western Australia
- Queensland Tertiary Admissions Centre (QTAC) in Queensland

For International Baccalaureate (IB) Australian students (Australian citizens) as well as the international students in Australia, the "Australasian Conference of Tertiary Admission Centres" (ACTAC) calculates an Australia-wide ATAR-like national rank called "Combined rank which combines results from across all states, thus enabling IB students to "apply in any Australian state or territory with confidence about how their results compare to their peers who have completed state curricula and received an ATAR", also "when completing your final year of schooling, ensure that you provide permission via your school for your IB results to be released to Australian tertiary admissions centres. As long as you identify yourself as an IB student and provide your IB candidate number when applying for courses, your IB scores and subject results will be received electronically and automatically converted for the purposes of selection and meeting prerequisites."

== Universities in Australia ==
In addition to the following universities, the Australian campus of Carnegie Mellon University's H. John Heinz III College operated in the city of Adelaide in South Australia between 2006 and 2022. University College London also operated an Australian campus in Adelaide between 2009 and 2017. The newest Australian institution to receive university status is the Australian University of Theology in 2025.

University	Type	Campus	State/ Territory	Estab.	University status	Times rank	ARWU rank	QS rank	US News rank	CWTS rank
Adelaide University	Public	Adelaide, Magill, Mawson Lakes, Roseworthy, Mount Gambier, Waite, Whyalla	(South Australia) SA	2024	2024	N/A	N/A	82=	N/A	N/A
Australian Catholic University	Public	Brisbane, Canberra, Melbourne, North Sydney, Blacktown, Ballarat, Strathfield, Italy	(Australia) National	1991	1991	401–500	601–700	851 - 900	416	1374
Australian National University	Public	Canberra	(Australian Capital Territory) ACT	1946	1946	67	101-150	32	62	259
Australian University of Theology	Private collegiate (Australian)	Sydney	(New South Wales) NSW	1891	2025	N/A	N/A	N/A	N/A	N/A
Avondale University	Non-profit private (Australian)	Lake Macquarie, Wahroonga	(New South Wales) NSW	1897	2021	N/A	N/A	N/A	N/A	N/A
Bond University	Non-profit private (Australian)	Gold Coast	(Queensland) QLD	1987	1987	401–500	901–1000	591=	1455	N/A
Central Queensland University	Public	Rockhampton, Mackay, Brisbane, Sydney, Townsville, Cairns, Melbourne, Adelaide, Bundaberg, Gladstone, Indonesia	(Queensland) QLD	1967	1992	501–600	N/A	499=	1095	1329
Charles Darwin University	Public	Darwin	(Northern Territory) NT	1989	2003	401–500	601–700	584=	959	N/A
Charles Sturt University	Public	Albury, Bathurst, Wagga Wagga, Orange, Port Macquarie, Brisbane, Sydney, (Note: For international students only.) Melbourne	(New South Wales) NSW	1948	1989	801–1000	N/A	951–1000	764	1229
Curtin University	Public	Perth, Kalgoorlie, Singapore, Malaysia, Dubai, Mauritius	(Western Australia) WA	1966	1986	201–250	201–300	184=	160	310
Deakin University	Public	Melbourne, Geelong, Warrnambool	(Victoria (state)) VIC	1887	1974	251–300	201–300	207=	217	297
Edith Cowan University	Public	Perth, Bunbury	(Western Australia) WA	1902	1991	351–400	601–700	487=	495	1003
Federation University Australia	Public	Ballarat, Melbourne, Churchill, Horsham	(Victoria (state)) VIC	1870	1994	601–800	N/A	N/A	1288	N/A
Flinders University	Public	Adelaide, Bedford Park, Tonsley, etc.; Darwin (Casuarina and Tiwi), etc.	(South Australia) SA; (Northern Territory) NT	1966	1966	301–350	401–500	387	426	564
Griffith University	Public	Gold Coast, Logan, Brisbane	(Queensland) QLD	1971	1971	251–300	201–300	268	203	316
James Cook University	Public	Cairns, Singapore, Townsville	(Queensland) QLD	1970	1970	351–400	301–400	440=	324	698
La Trobe University	Public	Melbourne, Bendigo, Shepparton, Wodonga, Sydney	(Victoria (state)) VIC	1964	1964	251–300	301–400	233=	304	524
Macquarie University	Public	Sydney	(New South Wales) NSW	1964	1964	180	201–300	138=	192	360
Monash University	Public	Melbourne, Malaysia, Indonesia	(Victoria (state)) VIC	1958	1958	54	82	36	37=	49
Murdoch University	Public	Perth	(Western Australia) WA	1973	1973	351–400	501–600	423=	673	927
Queensland University of Technology	Public	Brisbane	(Queensland) QLD	1965	1989	199=	201–300	226	171	335
RMIT University	Public	Melbourne, Vietnam	(Victoria (state)) VIC	1887	1992	251–300	301–400	125	209	378
Southern Cross University	Public	Coffs Harbour, Lismore, Tweed Heads, Gold Coast, Sydney, Melbourne	(New South Wales) NSW	1970	1994	501–600	901–1000	638=	997	N/A
Swinburne University of Technology	Public	Melbourne, Malaysia	(Victoria (state)) VIC	1908	1992	201–250	201–300	294=	199	682
Torrens University Australia	For-profit private (International)	Sydney, Melbourne, Brisbane, Adelaide, New Zealand, China	(Australia) National, New Zealand	2014	2014	N/A	N/A	N/A	N/A	N/A
The University of Adelaide (now Adelaide University)	Public	Adelaide, Roseworthy	(South Australia) SA	1874	1874	111=	151–200	82=	74	220
University of Canberra	Public	Canberra	(Australian Capital Territory) ACT	1967	1990	351–400	801–900	494=	593	1353
University of Divinity	Private collegiate (Australian)	Melbourne, Adelaide, Brisbane, Sydney, Perth	(Australia) National	1910	2012	N/A	N/A	N/A	N/A	N/A
The University of Melbourne	Public	Melbourne	(Victoria (state)) VIC	1853	1853	37	37	19	27	28
University of New England	Public	Armidale, Sydney	(New South Wales) NSW	1938	1954	N/A	901–1000	1001-1200	821	1081
University of New South Wales	Public	Sydney, Canberra	(New South Wales) NSW	1949	1949	84	77	20	37=	52
The University of Newcastle	Public	Newcastle, Central Coast (Ourimbah), a suburb of Gosford, Sydney, Singapore	(New South Wales) NSW	1951	1965	201–250	401–500	227=	231	388
The University of Notre Dame Australia	Private	Fremantle, Broome, Sydney	(Western Australia) WA (New South Wales) NSW	1989	1989	N/A	N/A	1201-1400	1511	N/A
The University of Queensland	Public	Brisbane, Gatton	(Queensland) QLD	1909	1909	73=	73	40=	42=	50
University of South Australia (now Adelaide University)	Public	Adelaide, Whyalla, Mount Gambier	(South Australia) SA	1856	1991	301–350	401–500	340=	263	616
University of Southern Queensland	Public	Toowoomba, Ipswich, Springfield	(Queensland) QLD	1967	1992	351–400	601–700	410=	452	1210
University of the Sunshine Coast	Public	Sunshine Coast	(Queensland) QLD	1994	1994	501–600	701–800	1001–1200	1072	1126
The University of Sydney	Public	Sydney	(New South Wales) NSW	1850	1850	60	74	25	28	36
University of Tasmania	Public	Hobart, Launceston, Burnie, Sydney	(Tasmania) TAS	1890	1890	251–300	301–400	314=	273	491
University of Technology Sydney	Public	Sydney	(New South Wales) NSW	1870	1988	148	201–300	96	112	315
The University of Western Australia	Public	Perth, Albany	(Western Australia) WA	1911	1911	143=	101–150	77	83	203
University of Wollongong	Public	Wollongong, Batemans Bay, Bega, Moss Vale, Nowra, Sydney, Dubai, Malaysia	(New South Wales) NSW	1951	1975	201–250	301–400	167=	186	398
Victoria University	Public	Melbourne, Sydney	(Victoria (state)) VIC	1916	1990	401–500	N/A	741–750	649	1282
Western Sydney University	Public	Sydney, Indonesia	(New South Wales) NSW	1891	1989	301–350	301–400	400	234	615

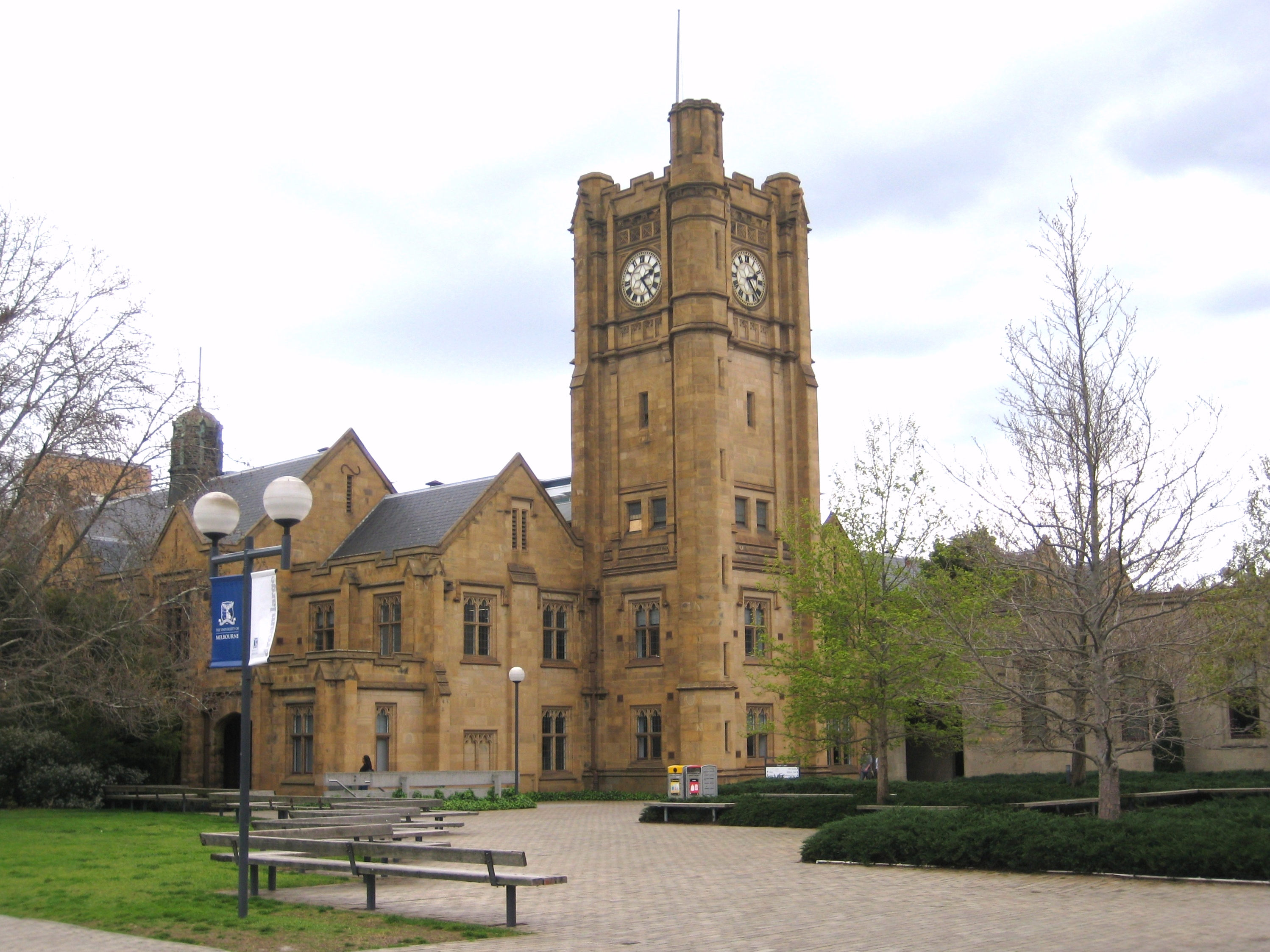
The University of Melbourne, Melbourne

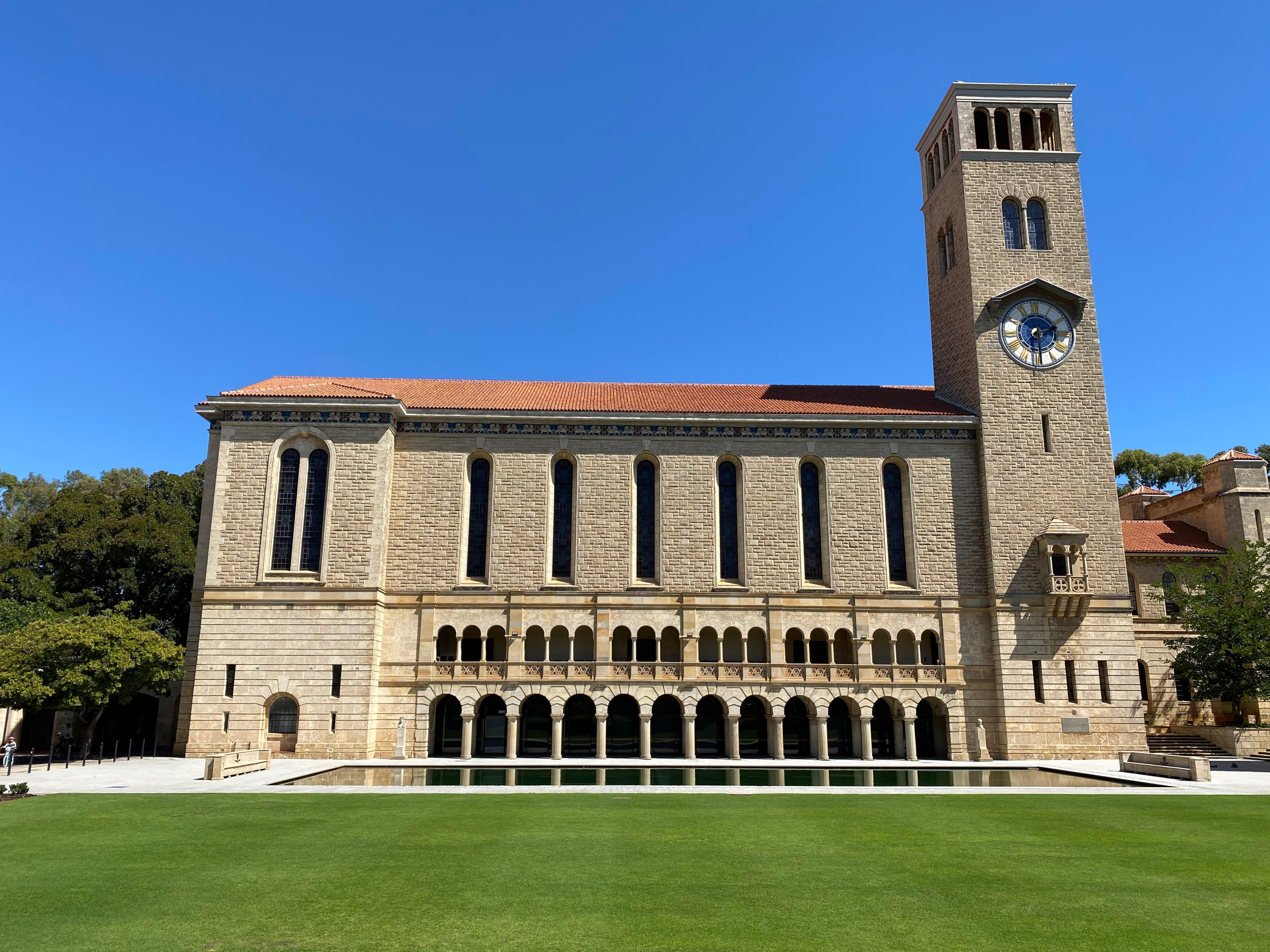
The University of Western Australia, Perth

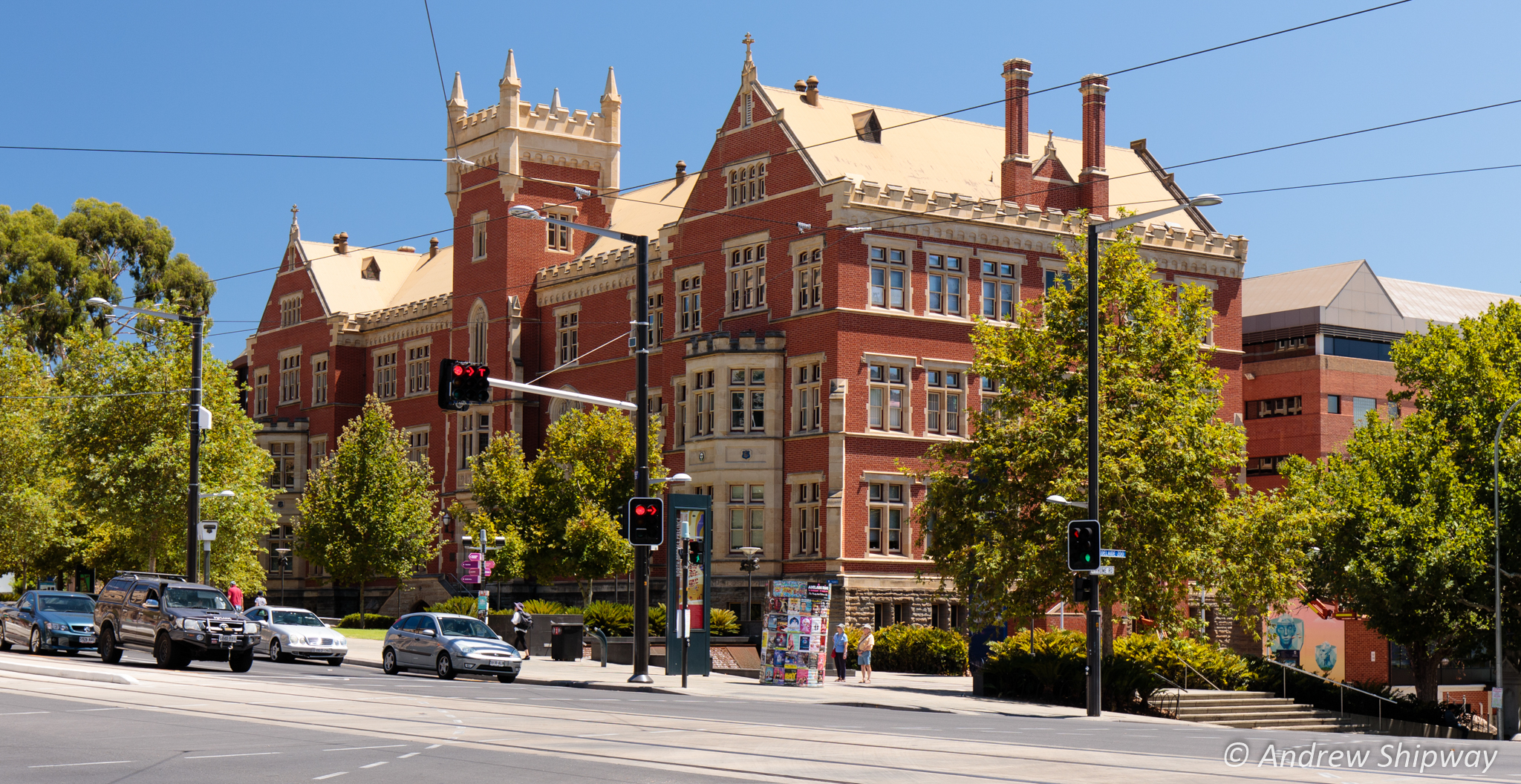
University of South Australia, Adelaide

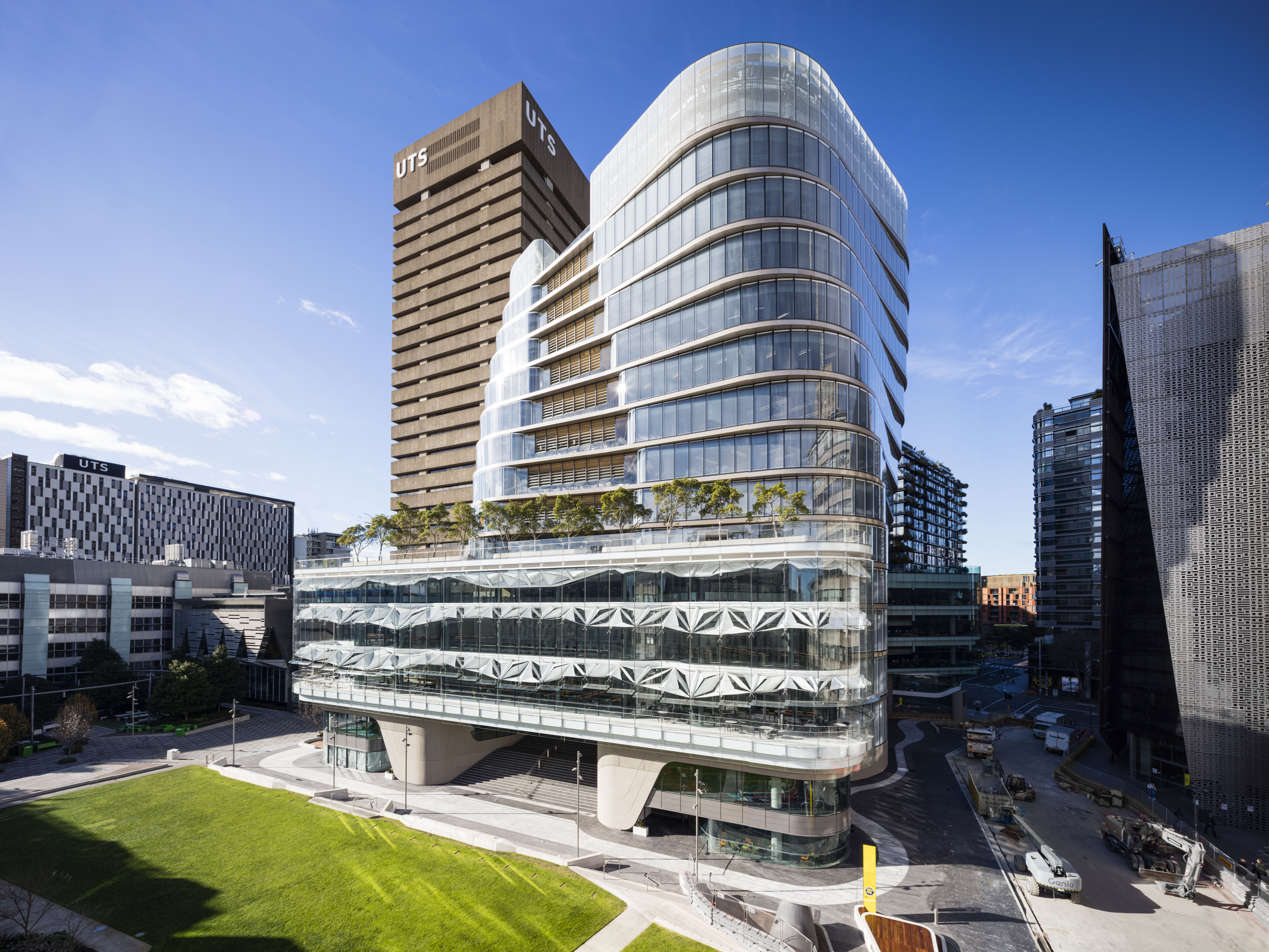
University of Technology Sydney, Sydney

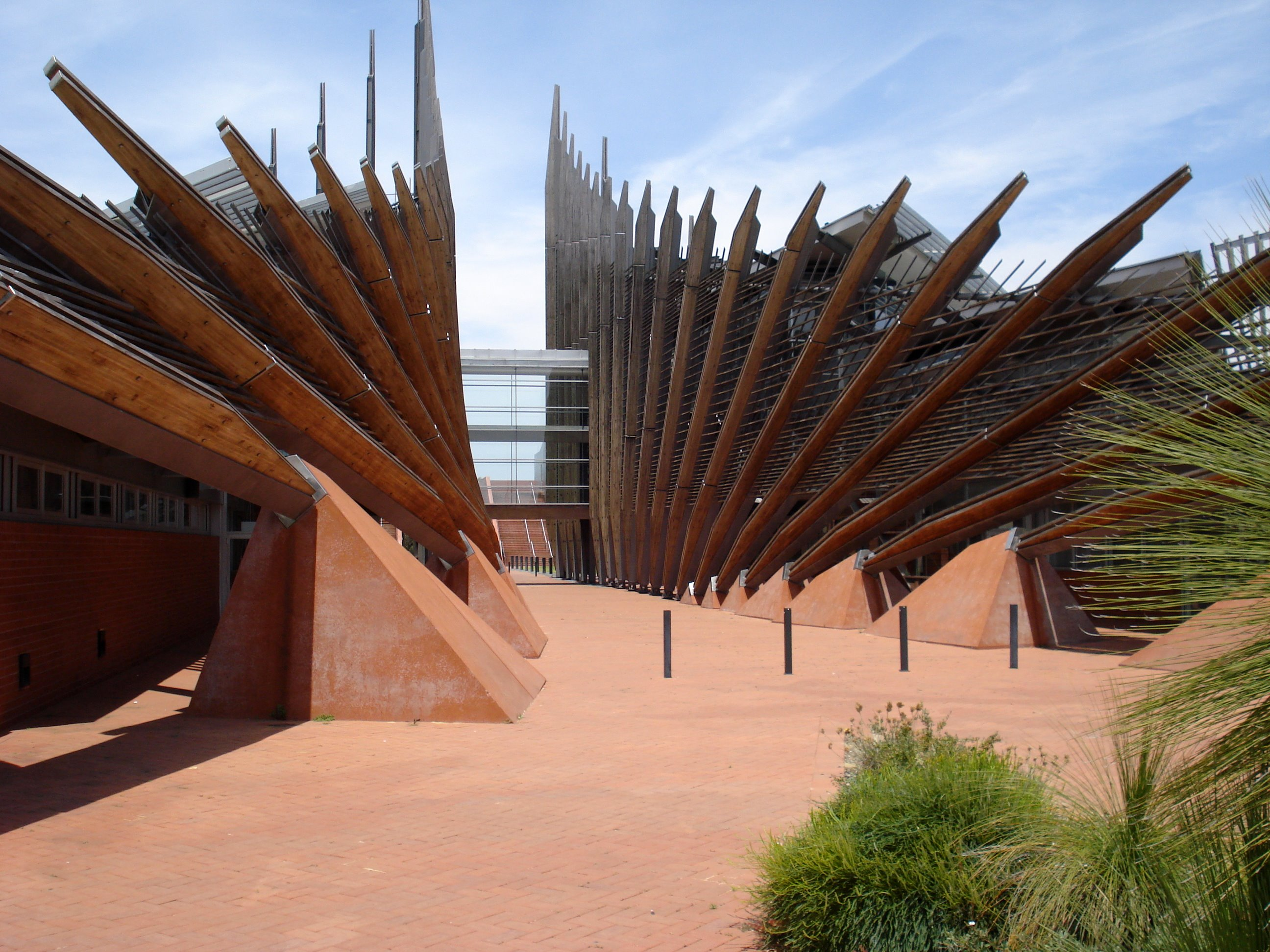
Edith Cowan University, Perth

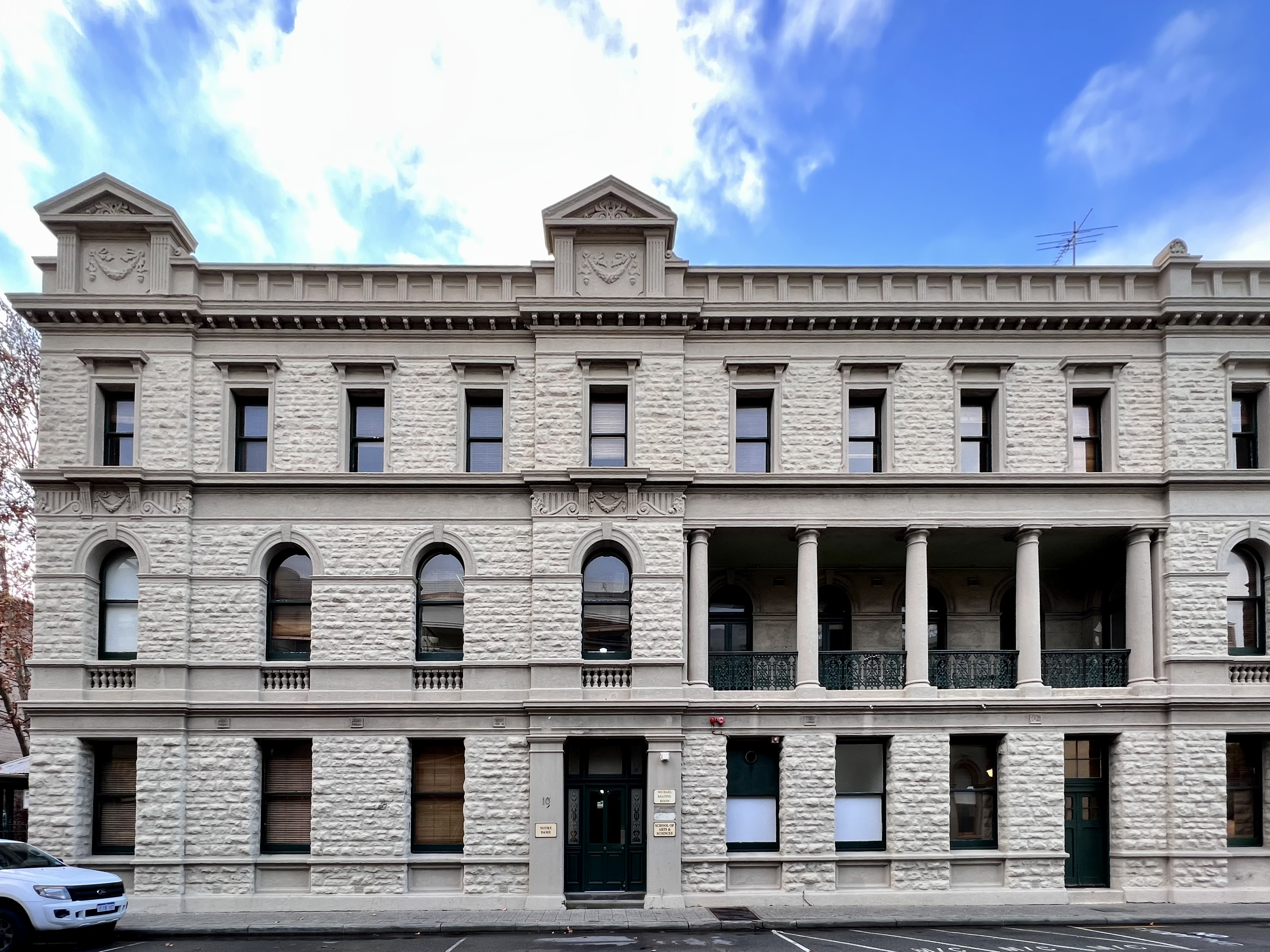
The University of Notre Dame Australia, Perth

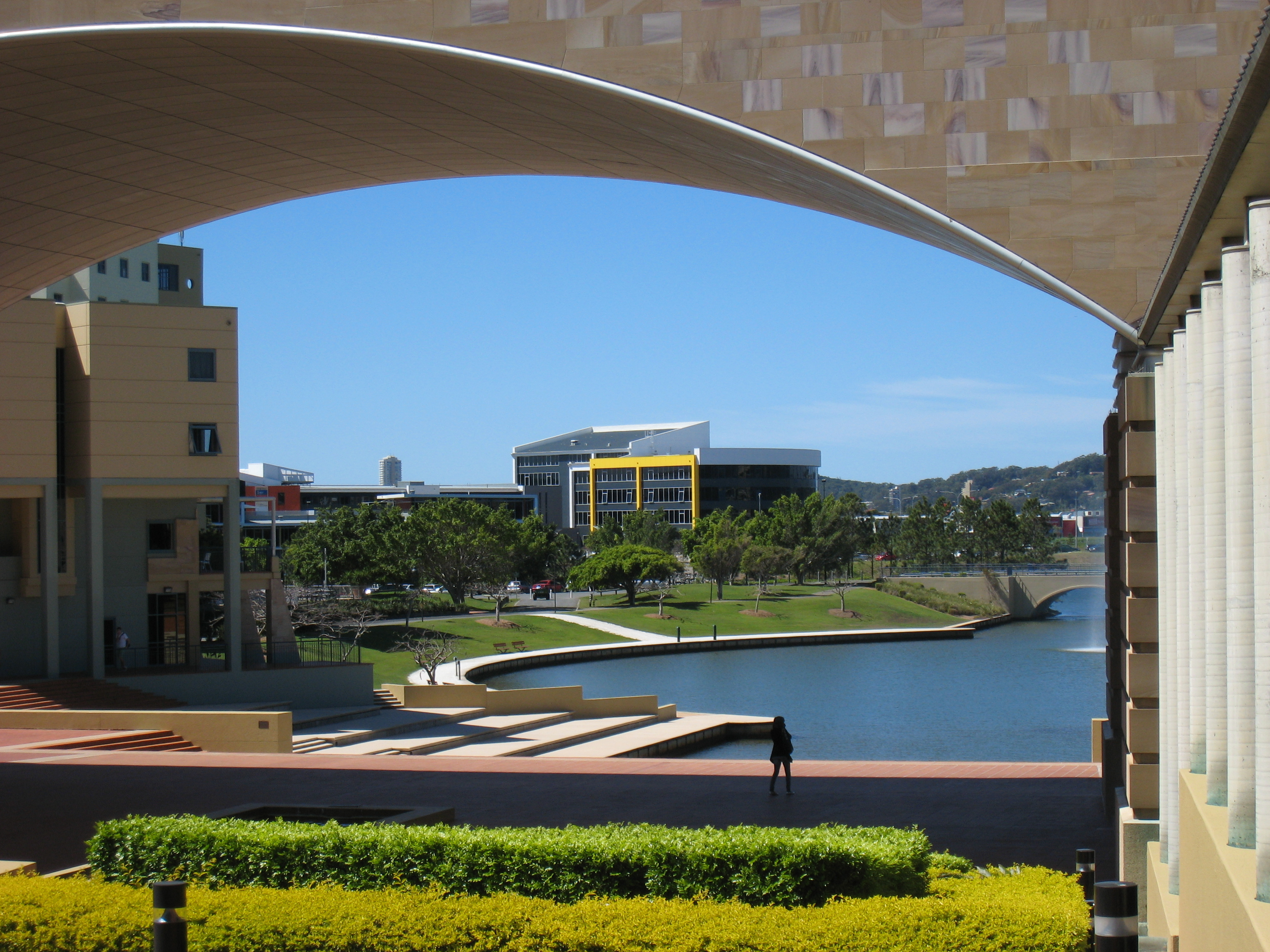
Bond University, Gold Coast

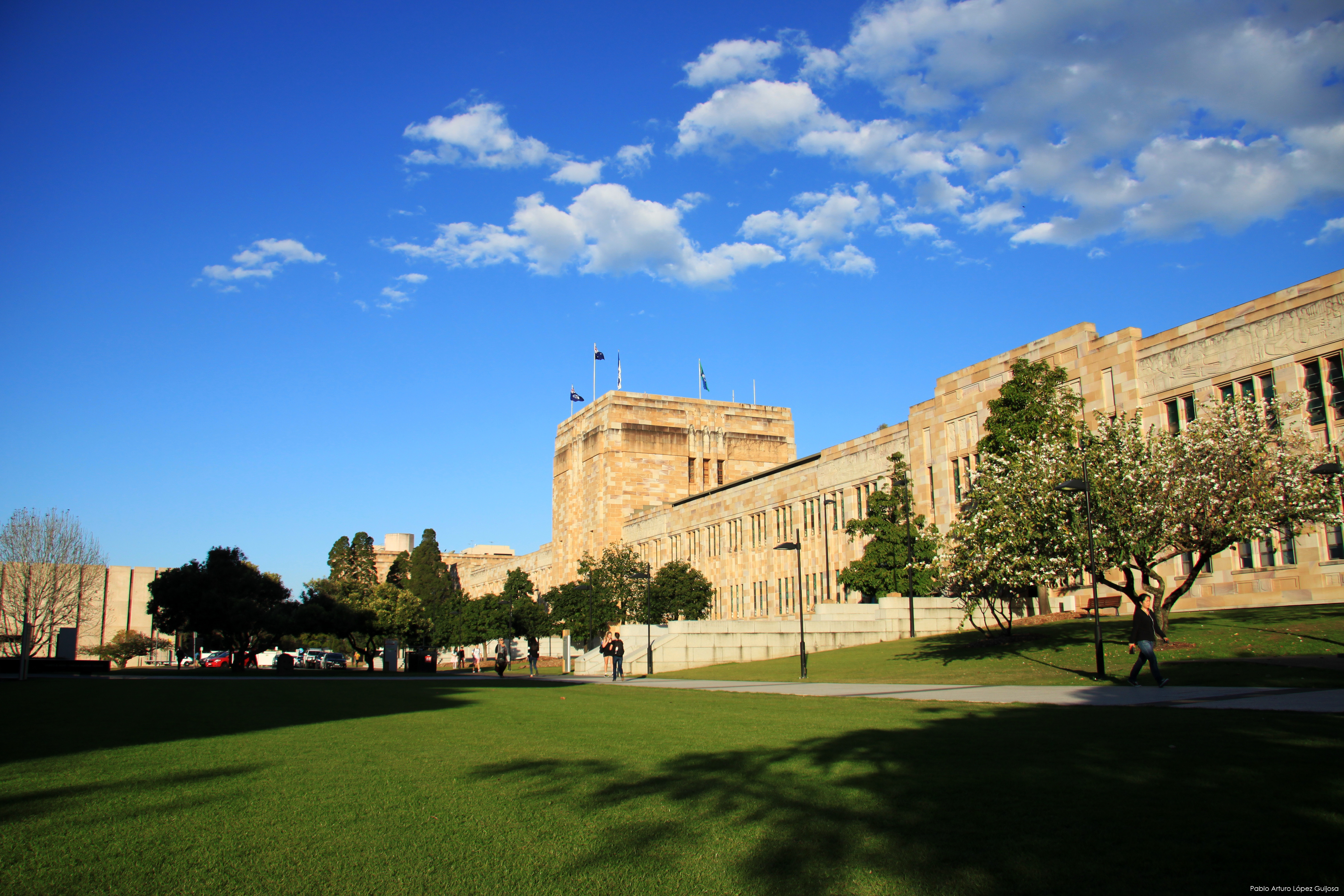
The University of Queensland, Brisbane

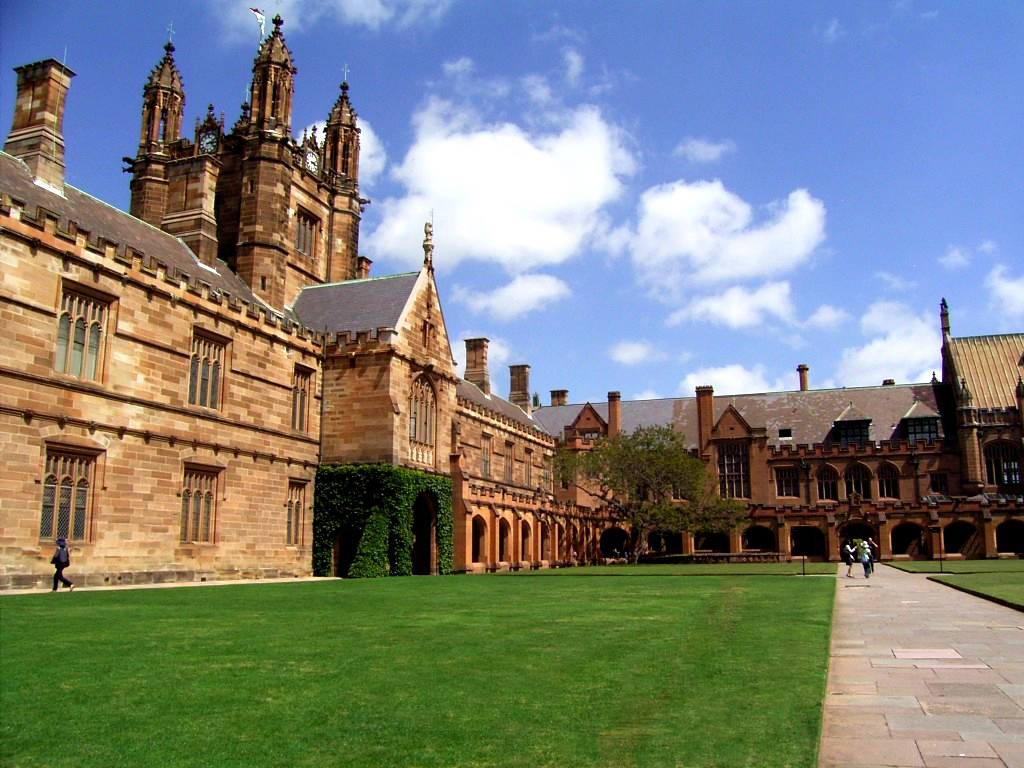
The University of Sydney, Sydney

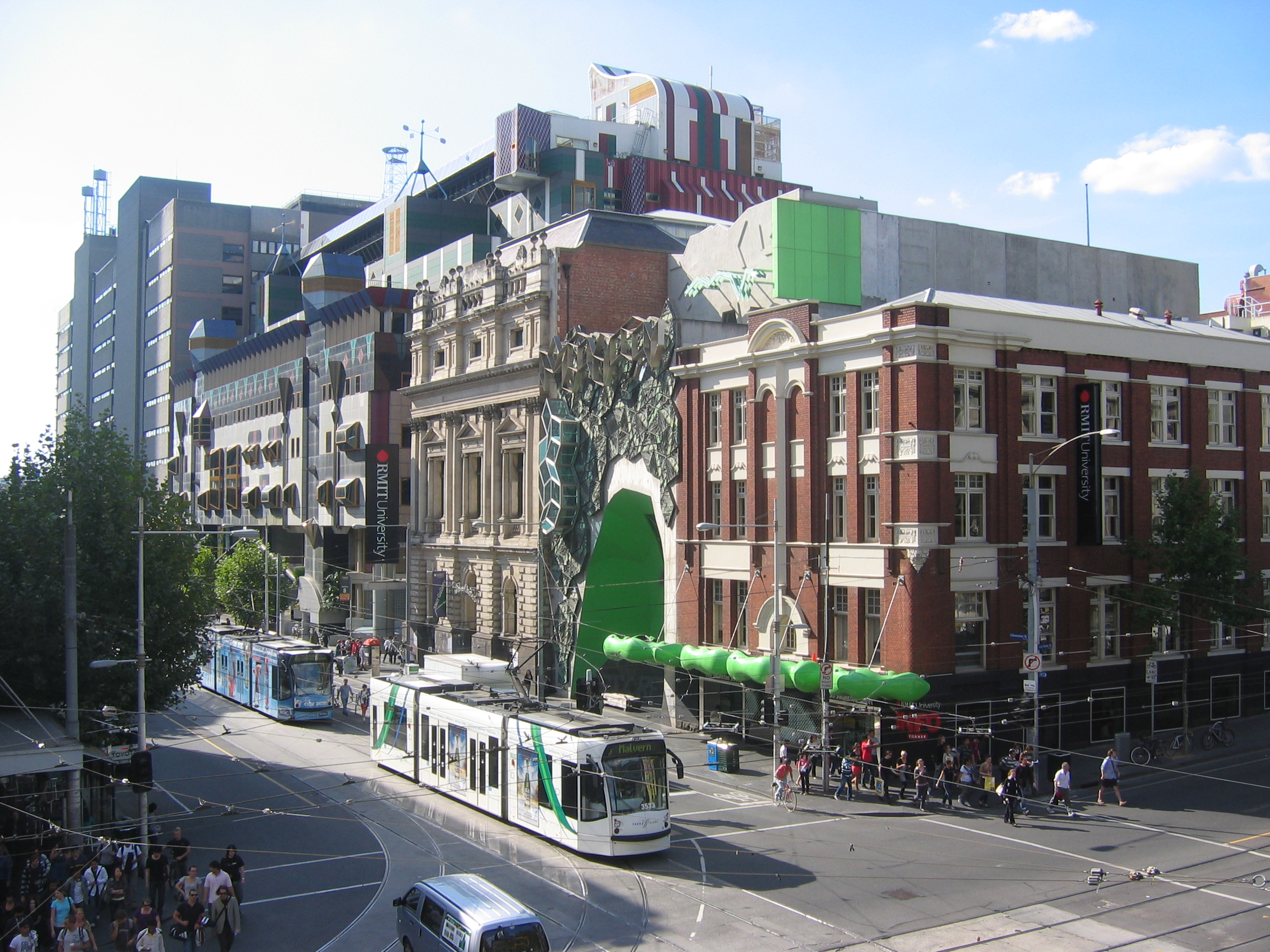
RMIT University, Melbourne

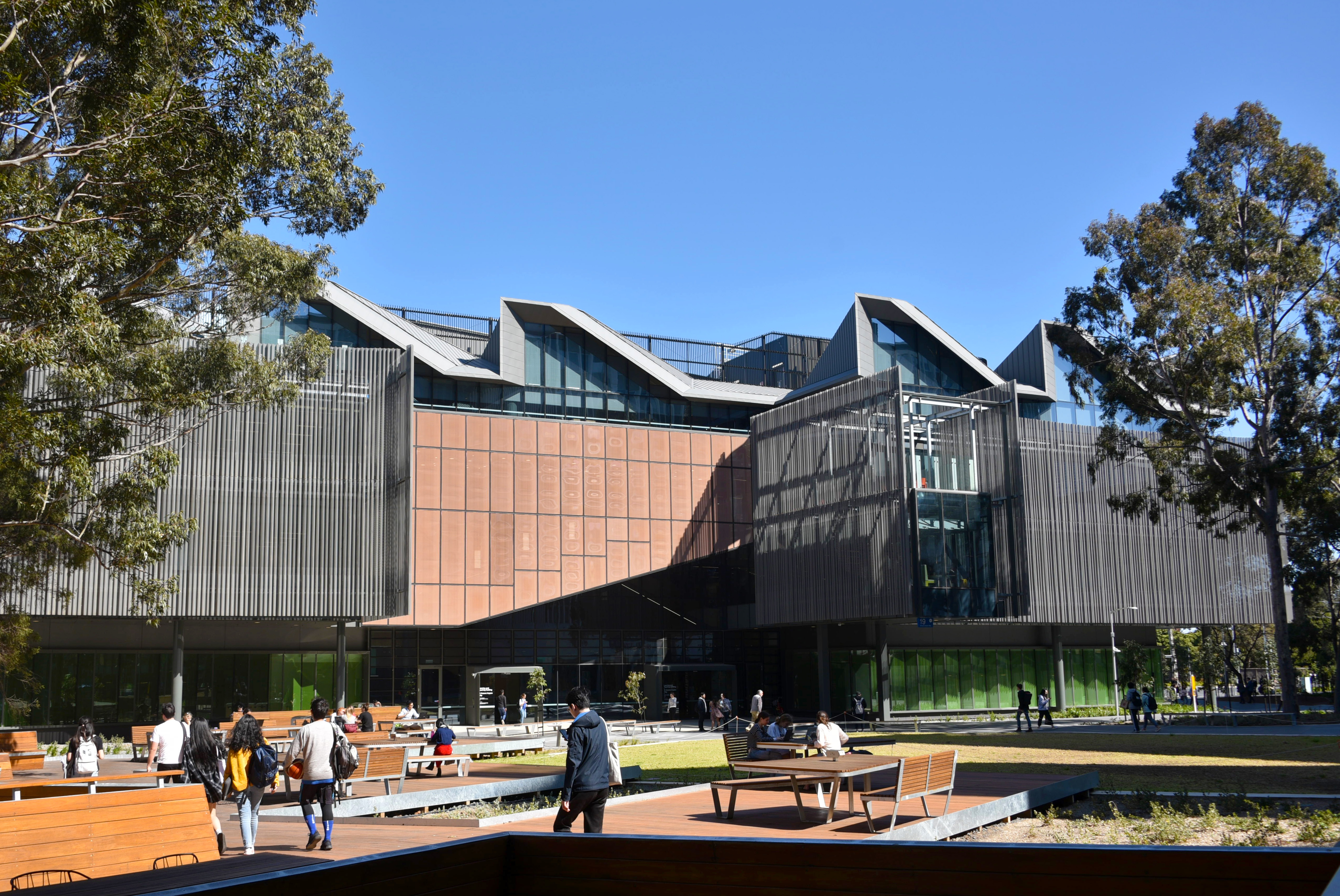
Monash University, Melbourne

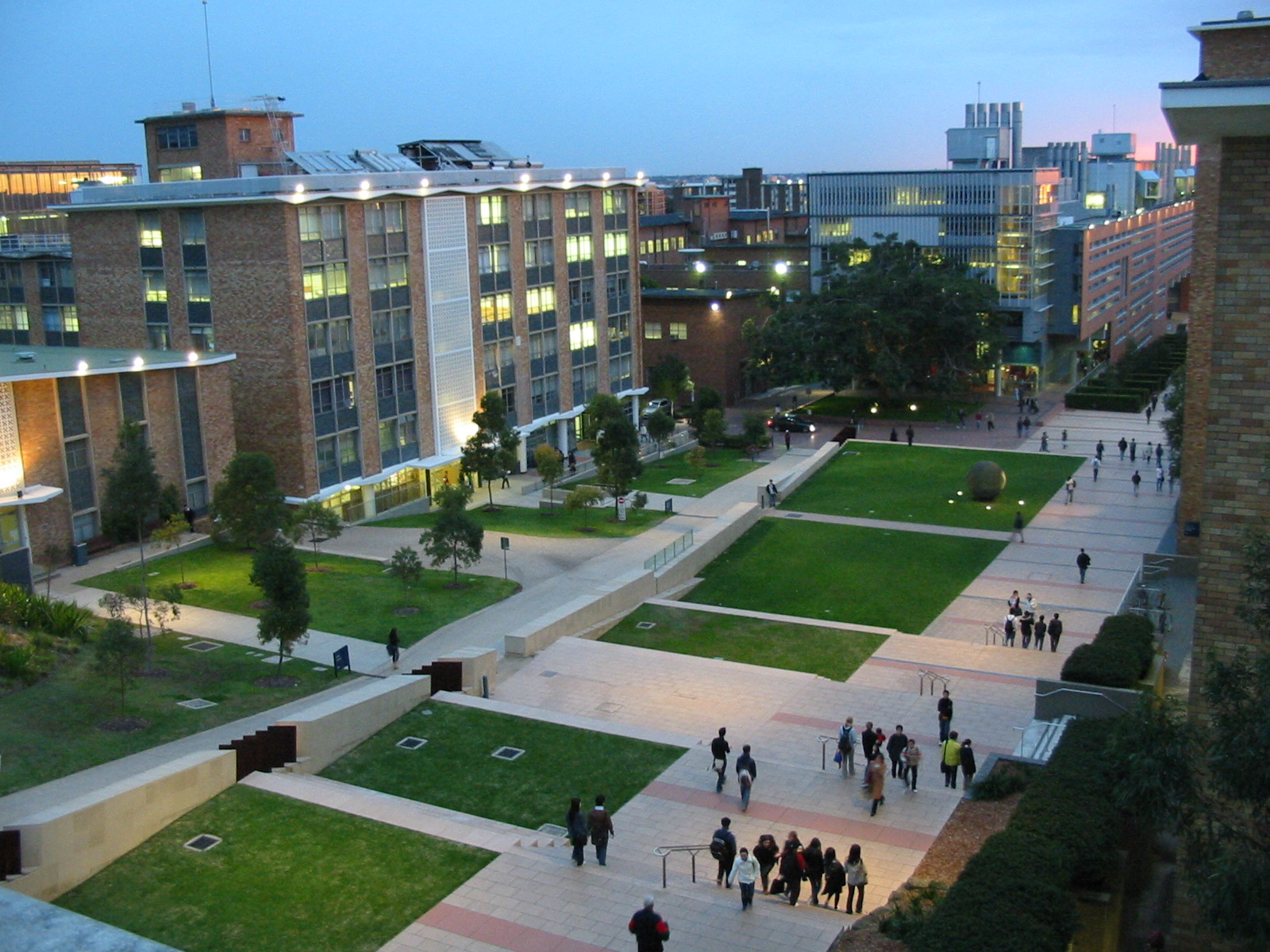
University of New South Wales, Sydney

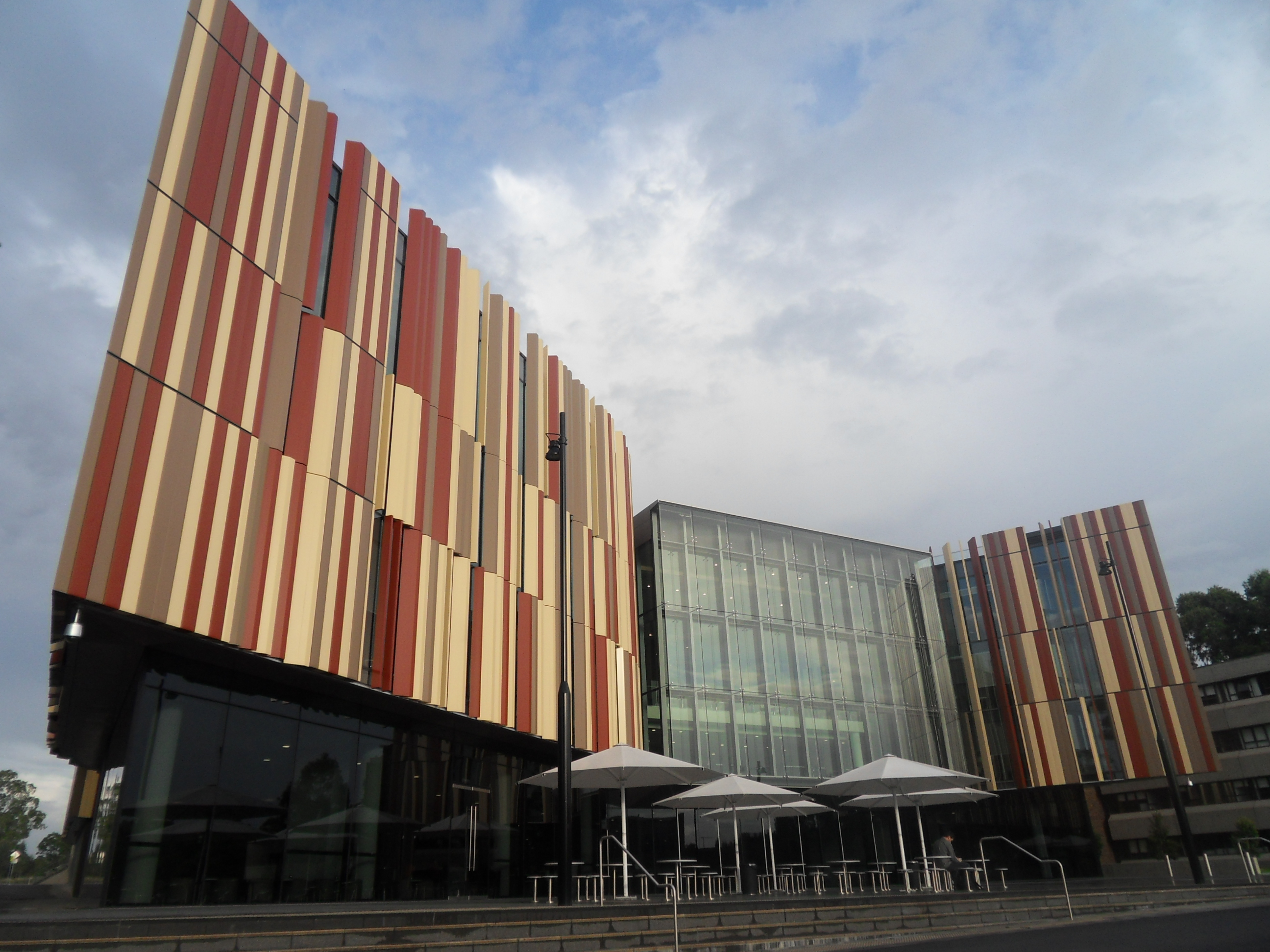
Macquarie University, Sydney

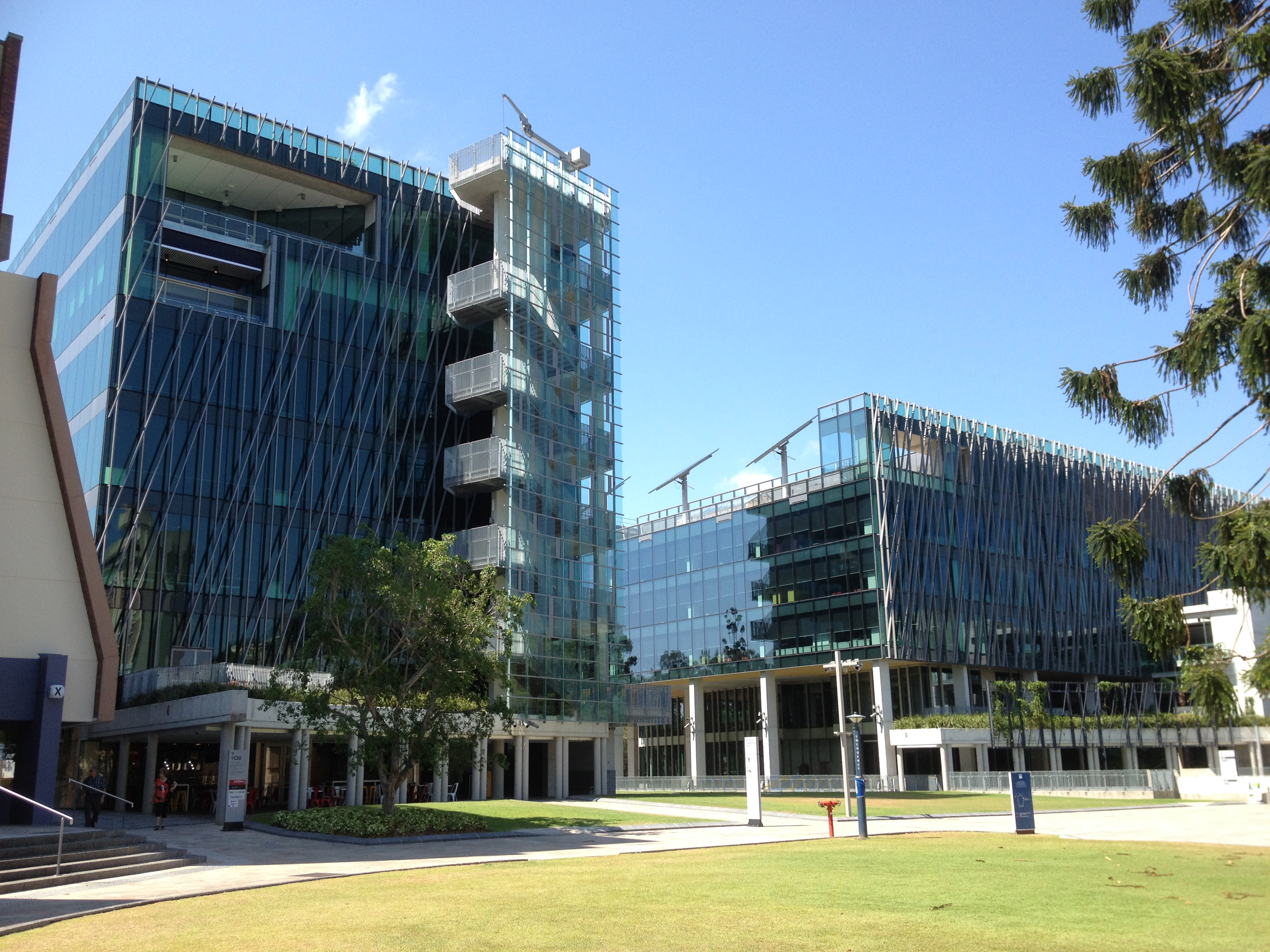
Queensland University of Technology, Brisbane

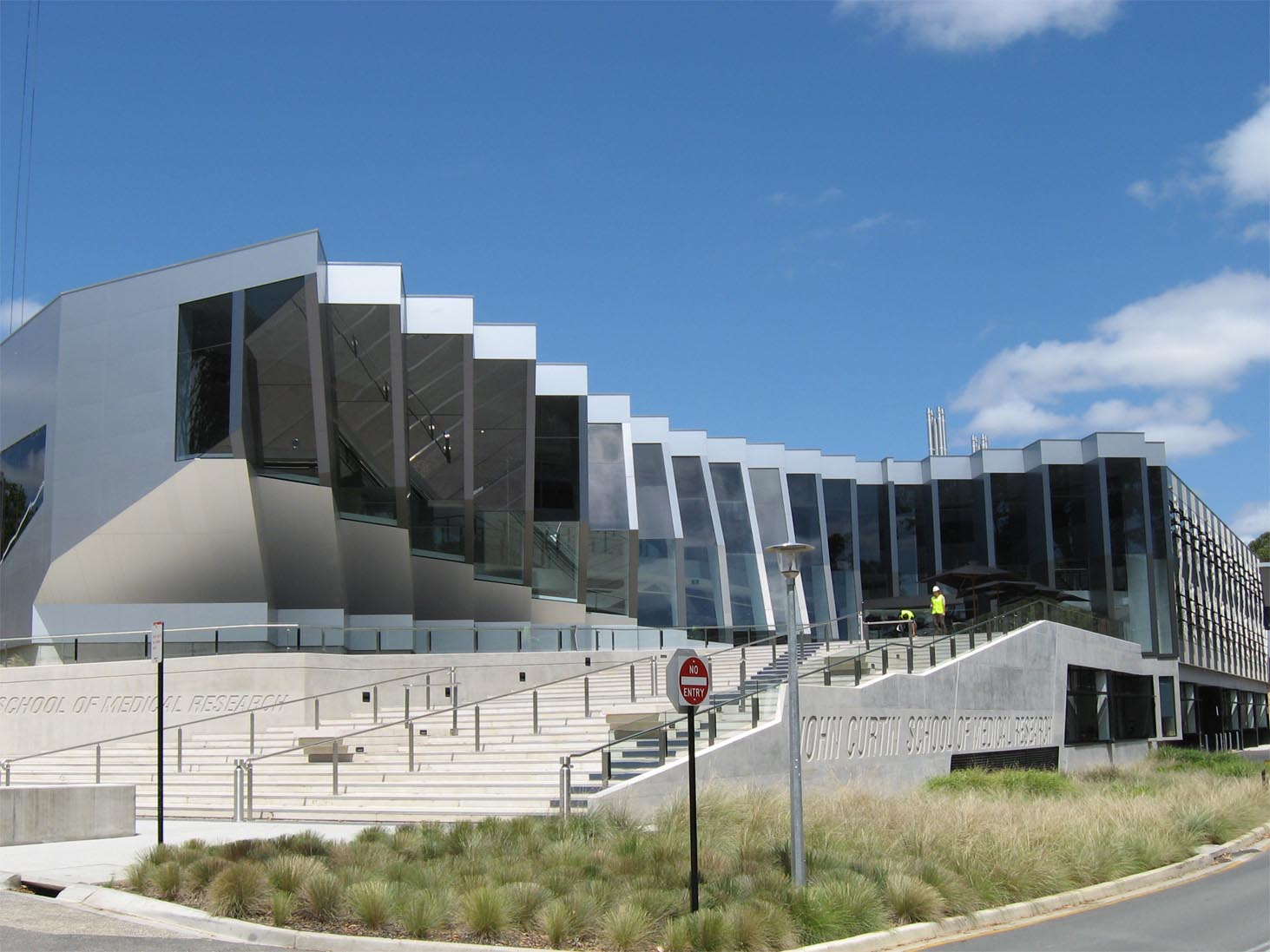
Australian National University, Canberra

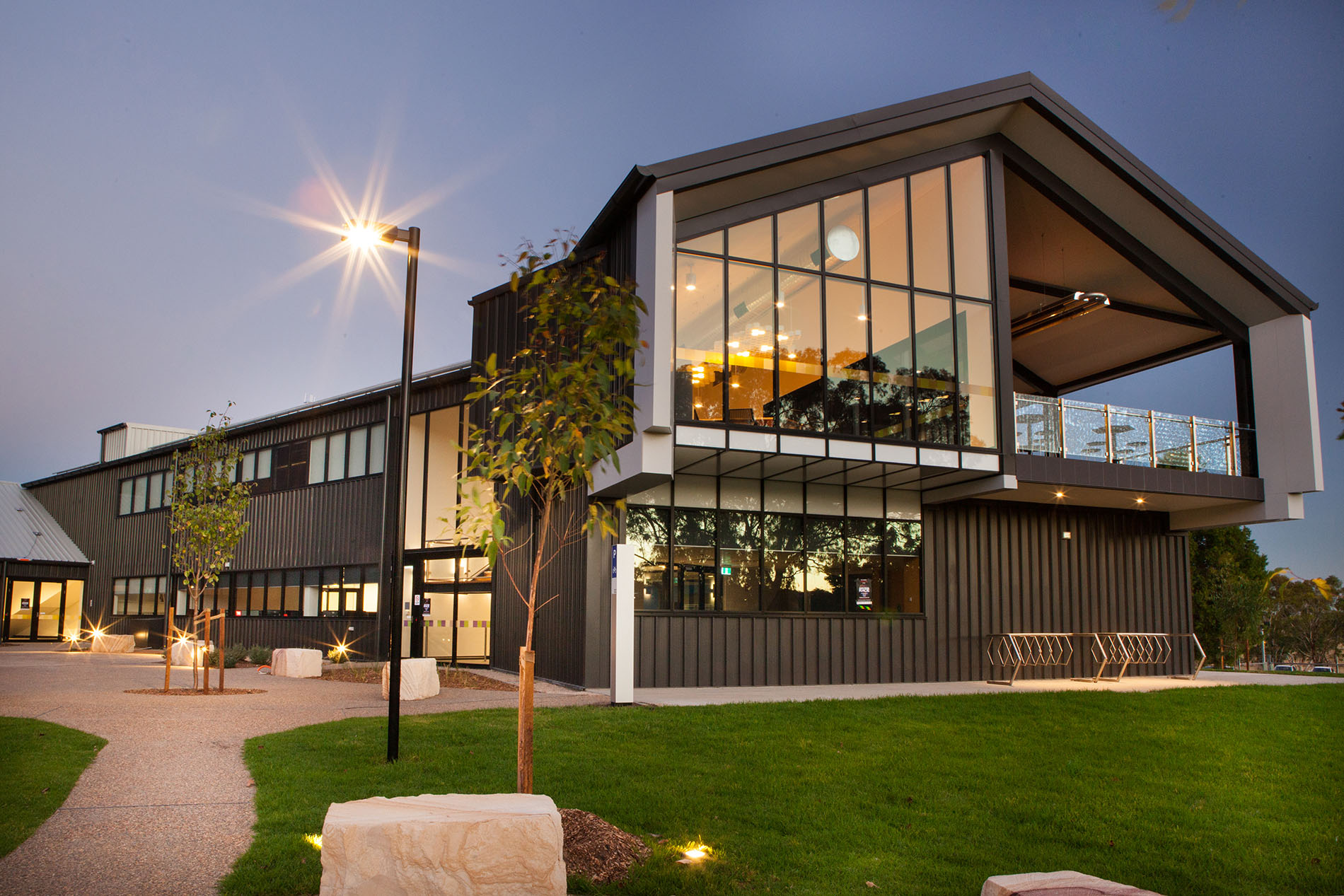
Charles Sturt University, Bathurst

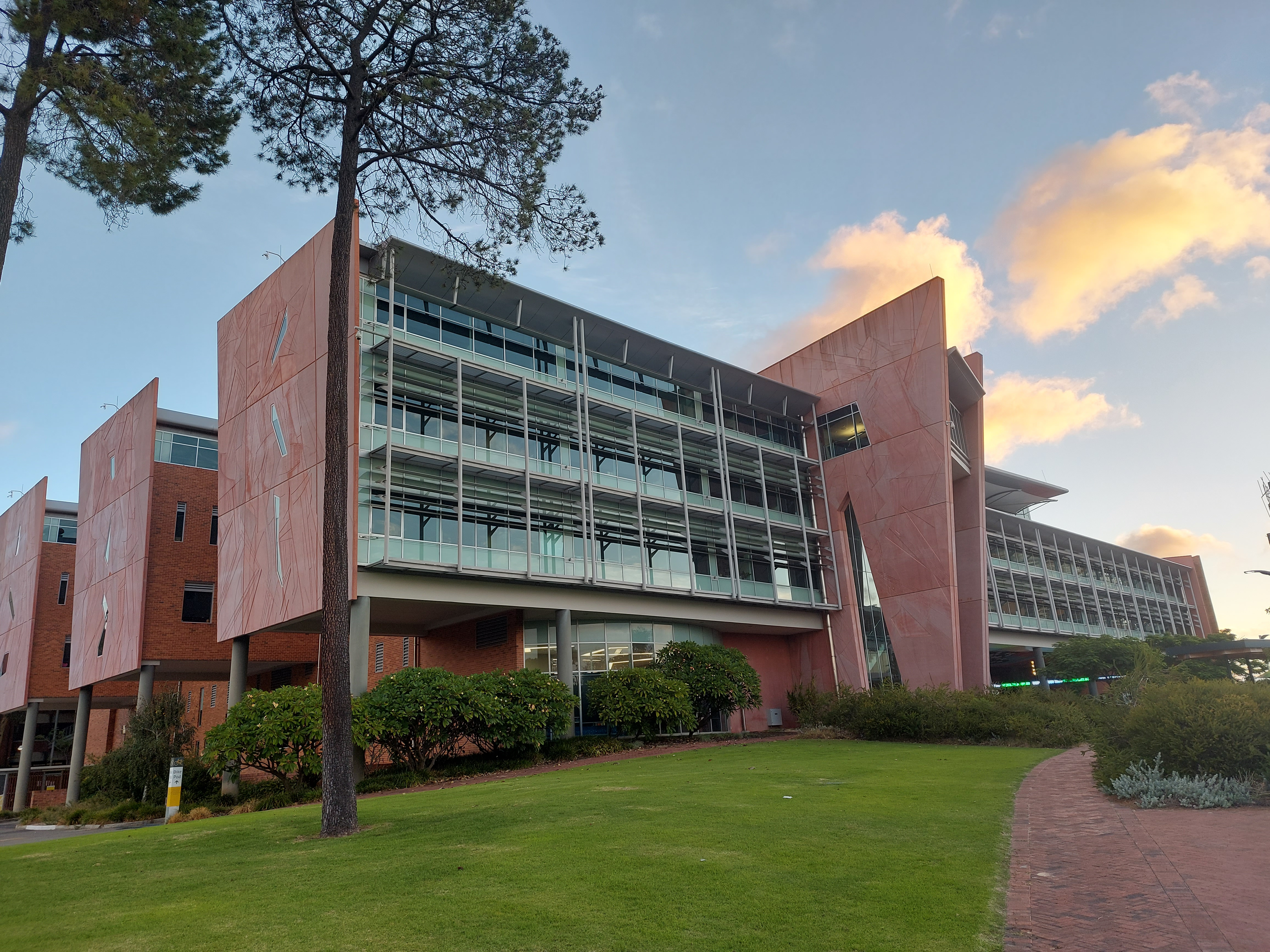
Curtin University, Perth

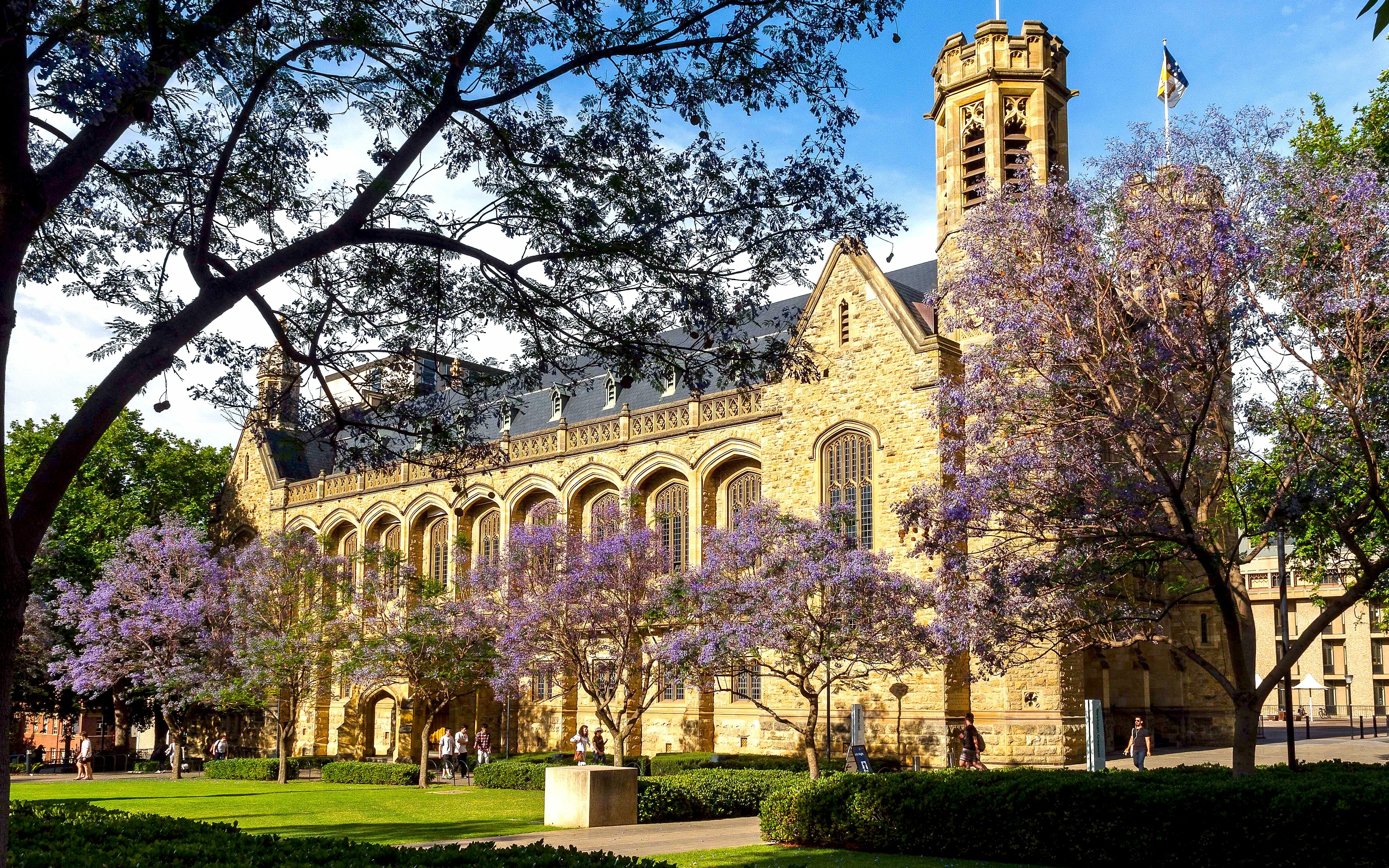
University of Adelaide, Adelaide

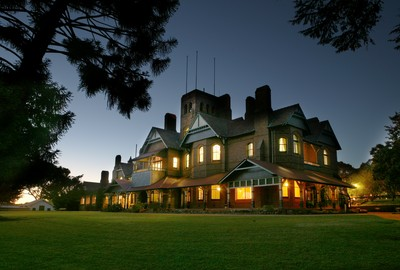
University of New England, Armidale

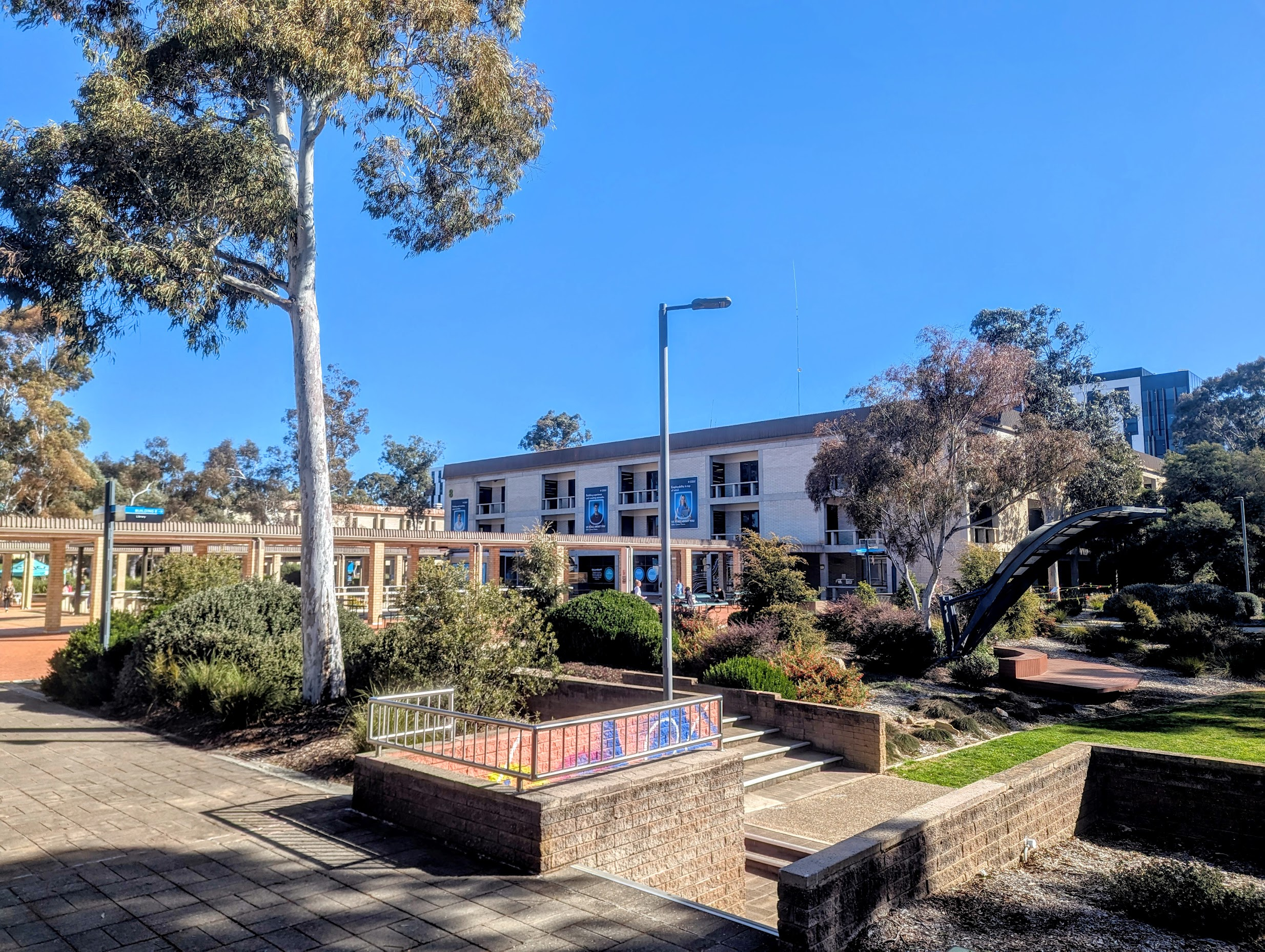
University of Canberra, Canberra

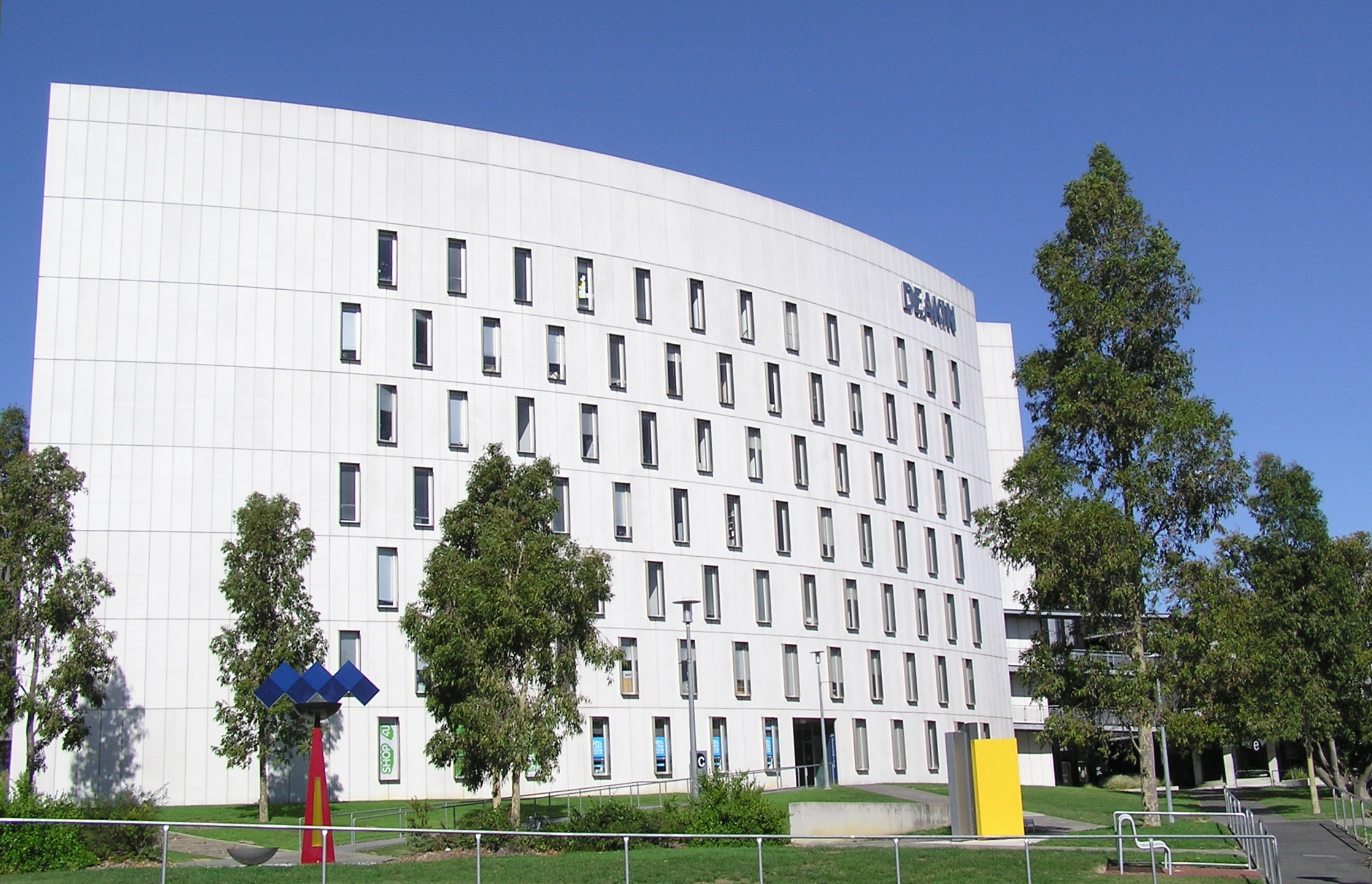
Deakin University, Melbourne

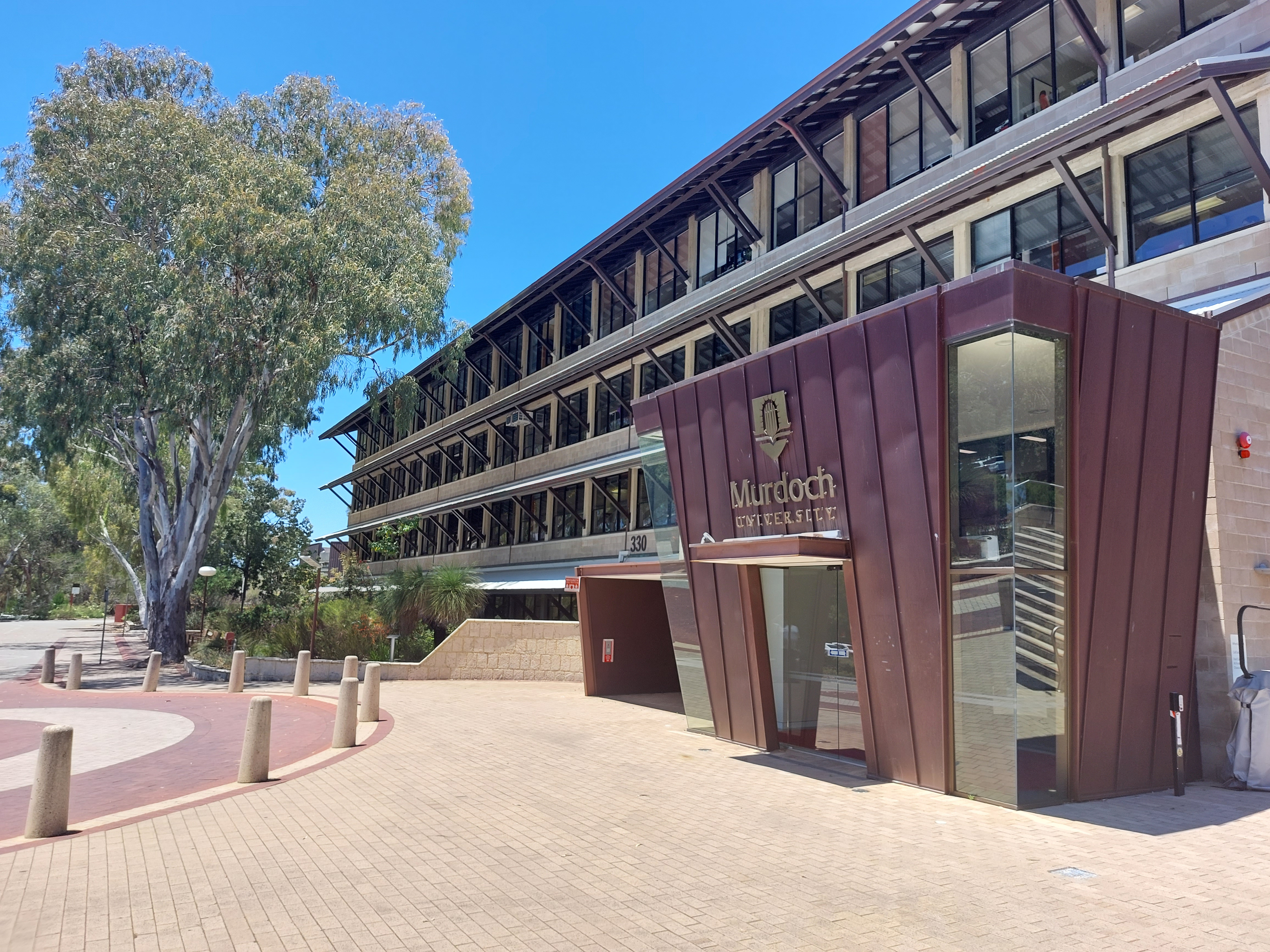
Murdoch University, Perth

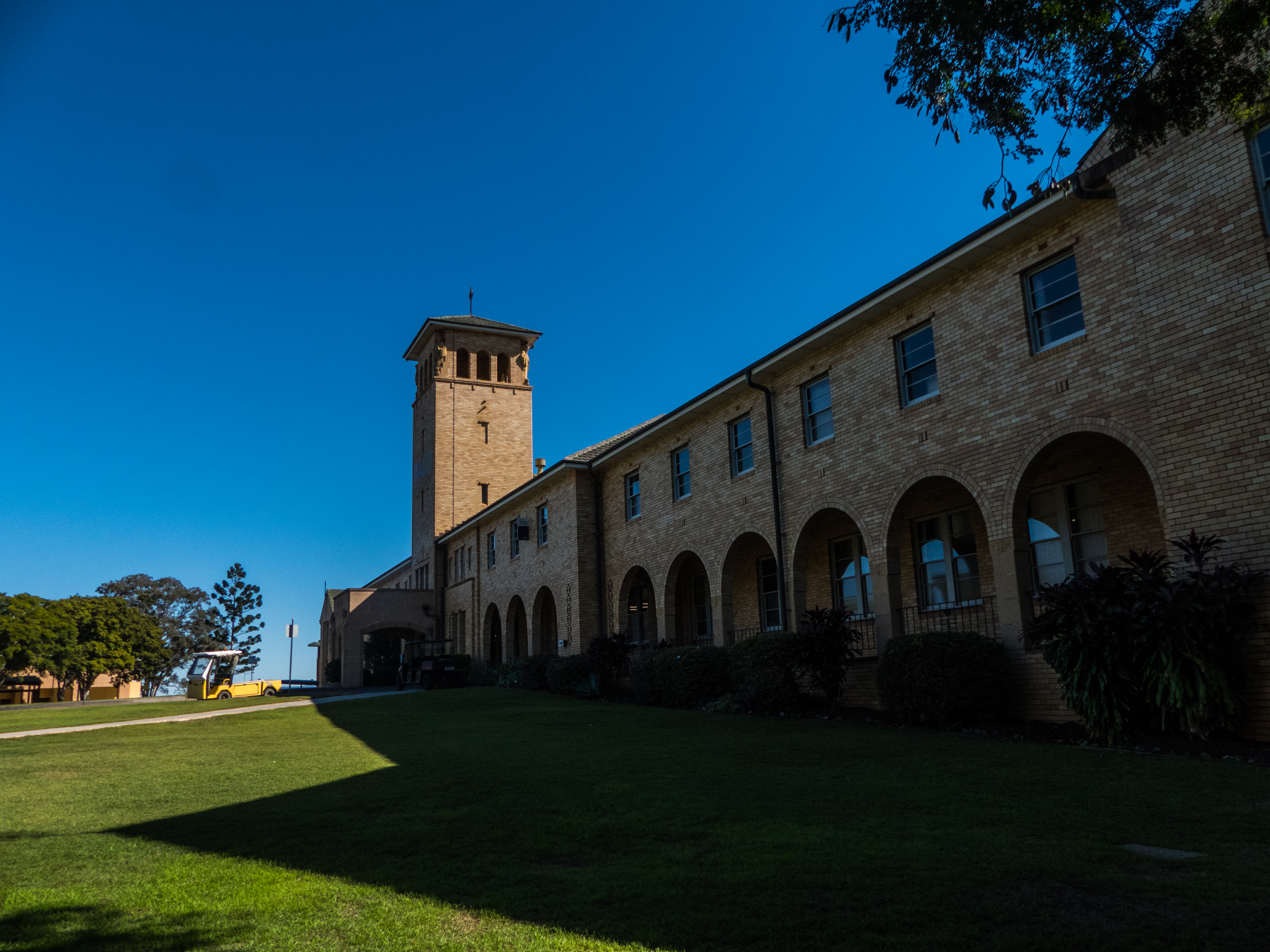
Australian Catholic University, Brisbane

== National university groups ==
- Australian-European Network – a network of 5 Australian universities who cooperate with 31 European universities on student exchange programs.
- Australian Technology Network – technology-focused Australian universities that mostly originated as institutes of technology.
- Group of Eight – research intensive high-ranking Australian universities, similar to Russell Group in the United Kingdom.
- Innovative Research Universities – a coalition of Australian universities with focus on higher education advocacy and research.
- Red Brick Universities – the University of New South Wales, Monash University and the Australian National University
- Regional Universities Network – a group of regional, distance education and multi-campus university networks.
- Open Universities Australia – a group of universities that offer distance education courses as part of a common platform.
- Sandstone Universities – an informal group of the oldest universities in each Australian state with colonial-era sandstone buildings.
- Verdant universities – an informal group of Australian universities founded in the 1960s and 70s, often with nature reserves or vegetation
- NUW Alliance – the University of Newcastle, the University of New South Wales and the University of Wollongong

== See also ==
- Admission in university in Australia
  - Australian Tertiary Admission Rank (ATAR)
  - Tertiary education in Australia
  - Tertiary education fees in Australia
  - IDP Education, consortium of universities which helps International students get admission in Australian universities.
- Living expenses
  - Austudy Payment (for above 25 years old)
  - Youth Allowance (for below 25 years old)
  - Medicare (Australia), access by obtaining Medicare card (Australia)
  - Pharmaceutical Benefits Scheme (PBS), supplements the Medicare
- Institutes
  - Schools in Australia
  - Technical and Further Education (TAFE)
  - Universities in Australia by annual revenue
  - Universities in Australia by enrolment
  - Universities by country
- List of Australian university leaders
