= International Network of Churches =

Australian network of Pentecostal churches

- Abbreviation: INC
- Formation: 1974; 52 years ago
- Type: Nonprofit
- Legal status: Charity
- Headquarters: Brisbane, Australia
- Revenue: A$86.8M (2026)
- Expenses: A$80.2M (2026)
- Staff: 422 (2023)
- Website: www.inc.org.au
- Formerly called: Christian Outreach Centre

The International Network of Churches (INC), formerly Christian Outreach Centre (COC), is an Australian network of Pentecostal churches, most of them based in Queensland. It was established in 1974 as what is now Citipointe Church in Brisbane. It is committed to biblical Christianity, with both the Apostles' Creed and Nicene Creed as its foundational beliefs.

== History ==
COC was founded in 1974 in Brisbane by Pastor Clark Taylor. After 26 people had met in the Taylors' home on 16 June, the following Sunday, 126 people took holy communion in a rented building, and in October that year the group purchased a Salvation Army property in the southern Brisbane suburb of Woolloongabba. Three years later, COC had around 1,000 members and further churches were established across Queensland.

In 1978, the organisation became involved in education, and established three schools, in Brisbane (now Citipointe Christian College), Toowoomba (now Highlands Christian College), and Nambour (Christian Outreach College (Sunshine Coast), later Suncoast Christian College, situated at the nearby town of Woombye). In 1980, Victory College in Gympie was founded. It is Gympie's leading P-12 coeducational Christian school, with over 700 students. Christian Heritage College, a tertiary college, was later created as a teachers' college in Brisbane in 1986. It has since expanded into five fields: Business, Education, Liberal Arts/Humanities, Social Sciences and Ministries.

By 1988 the movement had grown within Australia and spread to New Zealand and Solomon Islands. In 2009, Pastor Ashley Schmierer, based in Brighton, England, was elected as International President.

In 2013 the COC movement is rebranded as the International Network of Churches (INC).

== Business names and status ==
Its registration as an incorporated charitable institution started in 2000 as Christian Outreach Centre Mansfield and went through a number of name changes, with its business name registered as Christian Outreach Centre as of 2022. Its status as a charitable institution, since December 2012, is based on two purposes:

- advancing religion, and
- purposes beneficial to the general public that may reasonably be regarded as analogous to, or within the spirit of, any of the other charitable purposes.

In the financial year ending June 2021, it obtained around half of its total gross income (nearly A$27 million) from donations and bequests, and nearly 20 per cent (over A$10 million) from government grants. It has a large number of business and trading names, relating to its many schools, churches, charities and various businesses.

International Network of Churches UK, the body overseeing INC operations in the UK and Europe, was dissolved in January 2023.

== See also ==
- Christian Outreach College (disambiguation), former name of several schools
