= City Point =

City Point of CityPoint may refer to:

== United Kingdom ==
- CityPoint, an office tower in London, England

== United States ==
- City Point (New Haven), a neighborhood in New Haven, Connecticut
- City Point, a section of the South Boston area in Boston, Massachusetts
  - City Point (MBTA station), a transportation station in Boston
- City Point (Brooklyn), a mixed-use real estate development in Downtown Brooklyn, New York
- City Point, Virginia, an extinct town (now a portion of Hopewell, Virginia)
  - City Point National Cemetery
  - City Point Railroad
- City Point, Wisconsin, a town in Jackson County
- City Point (community), Wisconsin, an unincorporated community

== See also ==
- Citipointe (disambiguation)
