= Citipointe Church =

Church in Sydney, Australia

Coordinates: 27°31′57″S 153°06′50″E

Citipointe Church, formerly Christian Outreach Centre Mansfield, is a Pentecostal Christian church founded in 1974. It is the founding church of the Christian Outreach Centre network, now known as the International Network of Churches. The founding campus is located in the Brisbane suburb of Carindale, Queensland, in Australia. The church has multiple locations in south-east Queensland, as well as in New Zealand, Bulgaria and the US.

Citipointe Worship, formerly Citipointe Live, is the contemporary Pentecostal praise and worship group of the church, formed in 2004. They have released at least 13 albums, which are streamed on Spotify.

== History ==
Christian Outreach Centre Mansfield was founded under the leadership of pastor Clark Taylor on 23 June 1974, when 25 people met together in his loungeroom in Keperra, Brisbane. The Christian Outreach Centre movement has since grown into an international movement.

== People ==
In 1996, then pastor Brian Mulheran gave evidence to a Senate committee at an inquiry into sex discrimination law.

The church's global senior pastors as of January 2022 are Mark and Leigh Ramsey, who have held the position since September 2000.

As of 2022 former pastor Mulheran was principal of Citipointe Christian College and was the subject of a community backlash to a new enrolment contract he sent out to parents which condemned homosexual and bisexual identities. On 6 February, Mark Ramsey apologised to the congregation for any “confusion and pain that people felt this week”, regarding the controversial enrolment contract at the school, and then led a standing ovation for Mulheran, who had taken indefinite leave after being pressured to do so by some of the school's senior teachers.

== Locations ==
The church has multiple locations in south-east Queensland, as well as in New Zealand, Bulgaria and the US.

As of 2025, Citipointe has eight church campuses in Queensland: Citipointe Brisbane, Citipointe North (Caboolture), Citipointe Bribie, Citipointe West (Durack) and Citipointe Redcliffe (Clontarf), Citipointe Ipswich (located in Yamanto), Citipointe Pine Rivers, & Citipointe St Lucia.

The "Citipointe Campus" includes:

- the church
- a primary and secondary school (Citipointe Christian College)
- Citipointe Christian College International (ELICOS Centre)
- a college of higher education (Christian Heritage College)
- a Bible college (Citipointe Ministry College)
- a daycare centre (Citipointe Child Care)

Citipointe also has five international campuses, three in the United States (Citipointe NOCO (Northern Colorado) USA, Citipointe Nashville USA,) and Citipointe Franklin, as well as Citipointe Auckland (New Zealand) and Citipointe Bulgaria.

== Ministries ==
Citipointe Church initiated the Red Frog Crew who provide drug- and alcohol-free entertainment, medical help and volunteers at schoolies festivals.

Leigh Ramsey started the SHE Rescue Home in Cambodia, a place where trafficked and prostituted girls receive counselling, medical attention, education and vocational training.

== Citipointe Worship ==
Citipointe Worship, formerly Citipointe Live, is the contemporary Pentecostal praise and worship group of Citipointe Church that was founded in Brisbane in 2004.

Citipointe Worship was founded in 2004 by Aaron and Becky Lucas in Brisbane, Australia, where they originally began making music at their home church campus. Though originally based in Brisbane, Australia, Citipointe Worship has expanded into a global team of songwriters, producers and musicians. The group was called Citipointe Live until 2019, where they marked their rebrand to Citipointe Worship with the release of a self-titled album.

Since their foundation, Citipointe Worship have travelled internationally to play their music and train at churches and conferences worldwide. They have frequently travelled to the Philippines, New Zealand and USA. In 2008, Citipointe Worship featured at "World Youth Day”, which was the largest music event in the history of Australia with over 800 thousand people attending, including the Pope.

In 2020, Citipointe Worship was signed with major record label Capitol Music Group (CMG) to partner with publishing houses such as Watershed Music Group and Crossroads Publishing. Since then, they have partnered with Worship Together to release a single, ‘Great Things’, in both English and Spanish, as well as Citipointe Worship (Deluxe), featuring reimagined tracks from the original album.

Citipointe Worship has released 13 albums, with some of their most notable releases including You Reign (2007), Breathe In, Breathe Out (2019) and Into the Deep (2016), which has over 35 million streams on Spotify. Releases include:

- King of Me (2004)
- Heaven (2005)
- Anthem of Our Heart (2006)
- You Reign (2007)
- Devoted (2008)
- Commission My Soul (2009)
- Hope Is Erupting (2011)
- Higher Wider Deeper: Raw Moments (2012)
- Holy Ground (2013)
- Wildfire (2014)
- Into the Deep (2016)
- Mover of Mountains (2018)
- Citipointe Worship (2019)
