= Suncoast Christian College =

- Woombye, Queensland; Australia

Information
- Type: Independent, co-educational, day school
- Established: 1979
- Principal: Greg Mattiske
- Enrolment: ~803 (P–12)
- Houses: Abednego , Meshach , Shadrach , Daniel
- Colours: White, red, navy blue
- Website: suncoastcc.qld.edu.au

Suncoast Christian College, founded as the Suncoast Christian Academy in 1979 and known for some years as Suncoast Christian Outreach College, is a co-educational K–12 college located in Woombye, Sunshine Coast, Queensland.

== History ==
Suncoast Christian Academy was founded in 1979 by Pastors Neil & Nance Miers of the Nambour Christian Outreach Centre (now known as Suncoast Church).

In 1989, Suncoast Christian Academy changed its name to Sunshine Coast Christian Outreach College.

2004 saw the 25 years celebrations occur, and the name change to Suncoast Christian College. In this year, the school purchased the neighbouring 16-acre (6.5 ha) former pineapple farm to expand the educational facilities.

== Governance and ethos ==
As of 2022 the principal of the school is Greg Mattiske.

Its mission statement says that it aims "to provide a Christ-centred education that promotes life-long learning, develops excellence and Christian character, and fosters social responsibility", and describes its culture as embodying "faith, diligence, and love".

== Sport ==
Suncoast Christian College is a member of the Sunshine Coast Schools' Sports Association (SCISSA) and participates in a range of sports including soccer (football), basketball, volleyball, rugby sevens, water polo and netball in both primary and secondary.

=== College sporting venues ===
- Taylor Centre - Multipurpose indoor sporting centre was opened 2010
- The College oval - large oval area for multiple purposes
- The Green - medium size outdoor oval area was opened 2011

== Performing arts ==
Suncoast Christian College has a performing arts program. The college produces a biannual musical in the campus auditorium.

=== Sunarts ===
The Sunarts program is an extra-curricular program that allows students in both primary and secondary to learn an instrument. The musical instruments offered include keys, guitar, strings, drama and acting, brass, woodwind, drums, voice and dance.
