= List of Australian universities by annual revenue =

This list of Australian universities by annual revenue contains the public universities in Australia with revenue in Australian dollars.

Australian universities by annual revenue (AUD)
Institution	1996	2014	2016	2018	2020	2022	2024
University of Sydney	$598 million	$1.90 billion	$2.17 billion	$2.50 billion	$2.64 billion	$2.95 billion	$3.89 billion
University of Melbourne	$544 million	$2.12 billion	$2.28 billion	$2.53 billion	$2.66 billion	$2.67 billion	$3.70 billion
Monash University	$520 million	$1.86 billion	$2.07 billion	$2.50 billion	$2.70 billion	$2.74 billion	$3.46 billion
University of New South Wales	$531 million	$1.66 billion	$1.82 billion	$2.13 billion	$2.16 billion	$2.29 billion	$3.29 billion
University of Queensland	$443 million	$1.69 billion	$1.75 billion	$1.97 billion	$2.12 billion	$1.88 billion	$2.70 billion
Australian National University	$391 million	$996 million	$1.18 billion	$1.34 billion	$1.30 billion	$1.19 billion	$1.60 billion
RMIT University	$272 million	$966 million	$1.11 billion	$1.29 billion	$1.29 billion	$1.25 billion	$1.55 billion
Deakin University	$228 million	$856 million	$971 million	$1.20 billion	$1.22 billion	$1.10 billion	$1.46 billion
Queensland University of Technology	$274 million (Note: Combined revenue of QUT and Sunshine Coast University College)	$907 million	$993 million	$1.06 billion	$1.05 billion	$947 million	$1.34 billion
University of Technology, Sydney	$203 million	$700 million	$860 million	$1.05 billion	$1.06 billion	$1.02 billion	$1.31 billion
University of Western Australia	$129 million	$957 million	$924 million	$926 million	$969 million	$940 million	$1.29 billion
University of Adelaide	$256 million	$840 million	$895 million	$900 million	$977 million	$970 million	$1.29 billion
Curtin University	$253 million	$890 million	$915 million	$897 million	$903 million	$915 million	$1.22 billion
Griffith University	$217 million	$845 million	$917 million	$971 million	$968 million	$935 million	$1.17 billion
Macquarie University	$184 million	$765 million	$872 million	$1.01 billion	$974 million	$943 million	$1.09 billion
University of Western Sydney	$248 million	$741 million	$764 million	$909 million	$888 million	$876 million	$1.08 billion
University of Newcastle	$206 million	$676 million	$752 million	$767 million	$795 million	$756 million	$944 million
Swinburne University of Technology	$94 million	$521 million	$609 million	$723 million	$745 million	$706 million	$936 million
La Trobe University	$243 million	$666 million	$730 million	$799 million	$782 million	$813 million	$908 million
Edith Cowan University	$149 million	$392 million	$425 million	$453 million	$477 million	$472 million	$844 million
University of Tasmania	$172 million (Note: Sum of published revenue figures of the Australian Maritime College and University of Tasmania)	$544 million	$603 million	$764 million	$713 million	$752 million	$822 million
University of South Australia	$242 million	$584 million	$609 million	$658 million	$696 million	$667 million	$801 million
University of Wollongong	$150 million	$554 million	$601 million	$657 million	$620 million	$716 million	$767 million
Flinders University	$141 million	$435 million	$477 million	$506 million	$532 million	$549 million	$691 million
Australian Catholic University	$72 million	$414 million	$511 million	$549 million	$555 million	$554 million	$653 million
Victoria University	$142 million	$421 million	$422 million	$445 million	$474 million	$423 million	$618 million
Charles Sturt University	$162 million	$495 million	$550 million	$610 million	$569 million	$444 million	$587 million
James Cook University	$124 million	$509 million	$491 million	$503 million	$476 million	$447 million	$580 million
Murdoch University	$108 million	$335 million	$368 million	$360 million	$379 million	$365 million	$562 million
Central Queensland University	$94 million	$440 million	$379 million	$438 million	$450 million	$410 million	$544 million
University of the Sunshine Coast	Included in QUT	$215 million	$248 million	$303 million	$322 million	$346 million	$404 million
Charles Darwin University	$53 million (Note: As Northern Territory University)	$302 million	$278 million	$259 million	$308 million	$325 million	$377 million
University of Southern Queensland	$96 million	$308 million	$321 million	$328 million	$345 million	$327 million	$376 million
University of Canberra	$79 million	$258 million	$280 million	$308 million	$312 million	$320 million	$371 million
Southern Cross University	$59 million	$211 million	$235 million	$270 million	$291 million	$279 million	$362 million
University of New England	$134 million	$291 million	$298 million	$319 million	$348 million	$341 million	$362 million
Federation University	$50 million (Note: As the University of Ballarat)	$279 million	$263 million	$331 million	$343 million	$267 million	$314 million
The University of Notre Dame Australia	–	$166 million	$178 million	$186 million	$199 million	$220 million	$259 million
Batchelor Institute	$11 million	$41 million	$40 million	$33 million	$31 million	$34 million	$36 million

== See also ==
- Group of Eight (Australian universities)
- List of universities in Australia
