= Citipointe Christian College =

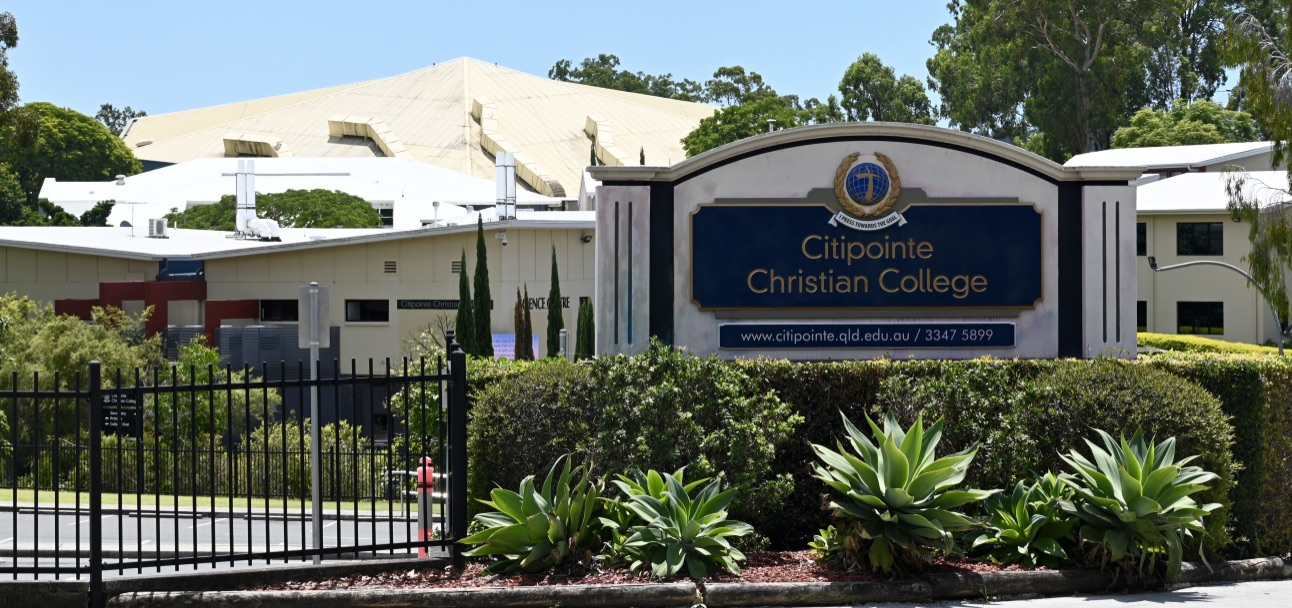
- School sign next to main gate on Wecker Road.

Location
- 322 Wecker Road; Carindale, Queensland, 4152; Australia; 27°32′00″S 153°06′42″E

Information
- Type: Independent
- Motto: I Press Towards The Goal
- Established: 1978
- Principal: Ruth Gravestein
- Employees: ~170
- Years offered: P–12
- Gender: Coeducational
- Enrolment: ~1700
- Colours: Navy, yellow & white
- Website: citipointe.qld.edu.au

Citipointe Christian College, previously known as Christian Outreach College Brisbane (COCB), is a K-12 Christian independent day school located in Carindale, Queensland, Australia. It is allied to the Pentecostal founding church of the Christian Outreach Movement, Citipointe Church.

The school was the subject of public controversy in January 2022 when the college disseminated an enrolment contract requiring parents to agree with the school making male/female distinctions on the basis of sex rather than gender identity, and to agree to a statement of belief addressing matters of gender and sexuality. This controversy resulted in the contract being withdrawn and the principal stepping down.

== History ==
The school that is now Citipointe Christian College was founded as Christian Outreach College Brisbane on 16 May 1978, four years after the establishment of the Christian Outreach Centre. Pastor Ian Feeney was the college's first headmaster, and its campus was initially at Kurilpa Street, West End. In 1982, the college relocated to its current campus at Wecker Road, Mansfield. In 1985, the fourth headmaster of the college Pastor Ron Woolley was appointed. By 1990, the campus included three buildings: A Block, an expanded B Block, and Kurilpa. Throughout the 1990s, four more buildings were constructed including a library; an oval was also made out of an acquired neighbouring property. Construction continued throughout the 2000s, including a science centre opened in 2006.

In 2018, Pastor Brian Mulheran was appointed principal of the school; he stood down from this position to take leave in February 2022. On March 31, he formally resigned his role.

=== 2022 enrolment contract controversy ===
On 28 January 2022, Citipointe Christian College disseminated a new enrolment contract, and communicated to parents that their students' enrolment at the school would be dependent on signature of this contract. The contract asked parents to agree that the college would make male/female distinctions on the basis of sex rather than gender identity (“inclusive of, but not limited to, for example, uniforms, presentation, terminology, use of facilities and amenities, participation in sporting events and accommodation”); it also purported to enable the school to expel a student for actions that are non-compliant with these terms (or “doctrinal precepts”).

The contract additionally included a schedule containing a declaration of faith that "God intends sexual intimacy to occur only between a man and a woman who are married to each other" and that "God has commanded that no sexual activity be engaged in outside such marriage". The statement of belief listed examples of sexual immorality which deemed all sexual activity outside of heterosexual marriage to be "sinful and offensive to God and... destructive to human relationships and society": including homosexuality, bisexuality, bestiality, incest, paedophilia, pornography, and fornication. This declaration was drawn from the formal statement of faith of the International Network of Churches, which is the school's governing body.

The contract drew backlash, and on 30 January the school published a media statement on its website. A teacher at the school resigned in protest and planned to move her child to another school, An online petition calling on the school to rescind the contract grew quickly, garnering more than 150,000 signatures before the school finally retracted the contract on 3 February. As of 6 February 2021, a petition in support of Citipointe has attracted over 35,000 signatures. Queensland's Education Minister Grace Grace described the contract as "unacceptable" and "very distressing", and federal member Angie Bell said she thought it was "simply wrong". The Lord Mayor of Brisbane, Adrian Schrinner, a former student and current parent at the school, said that he would be raising his concerns with the principal. On 3 February, Prime Minister Scott Morrison signalled his opposition in a radio interview, and said that his government's proposed Religious Discrimination Bill would make such contracts illegal under federal law. It was reported that some families planned to leave the school.

The school was referred for review to Queensland's Non-State Schools Accreditation Board by Education Minister Grace Grace in response to complaints to the Education Department, and complaints were additionally lodged with the state's Human Rights Commission. In response, the Commission released a statement to say that discrimination in enrolment on the basis of gender identity or sexuality, as well as disciplinary action and expulsion on these grounds, constituted unlawful discrimination. There is no information to indicate that these complaints were taken up. Human rights lawyer and academic Matilda Alexander said that action against a student under the policy would be grounds for a case under Queensland's Anti-Discrimination Act 1991, and so suggested that the contract may therefore not be legally binding. Legal academic Liam Elphick speculated that the contract would likely be illegal under Queensland anti-discrimination law, as did journalist Naomi Neilsen. Neilsen also noted, however, that under the proposed federal Religious Discrimination Bill 2021, the contract would be legal, which is also the understanding of Simon Rice. The school's principal said that the school had sought legal advice during the contract's drafting. Legal academic Neil Foster, however, identified that the contract would not be constitutionally invalid due to the operation of section 109 of the Australian Constitution with regard to the Sex Discrimination Act 1984, and that the proposed Religious Discrimination Bill would have had nothing to do with the controversy, as it was a matter that fell under the purview of the existing aforementioned Sex Discrimination Act.

On 3 February, the school withdrew the contract, after having "doubled down" the previous day in a defensive video sent to parents by Principal Mulheran.

A group of 23 parents issued a statement calling on Mulheran and the school board to resign, saying that Mulheran was "totally unfit to fulfil the duties required by his post". He held no teaching qualifications, although this is not required for private school principals. On 5 February it was reported that Mulheran would be stepping down from his role as principal to take "extended leave", after being pressured to do so by some of the school's senior teachers, who had threatened to resign. On 6 February, senior pastor of Citipointe Church Mark Ramsey apologised to the congregation for any hurt caused to them by the contract controversy, then led a standing ovation for Mulheran.

On 26 May, the school was referred to the Queensland Human Rights Commission. Five people lodged complaints with the commission over the school's enrolment contract. If the matter isn't able to be resolved by the commission the complainants would like the matter referred to the Queensland Civil and Administrative Tribunal.

In June 2024 the school reached a settlement with parents, who referred it to Queensland Human Rights Commission, through mediation. The school issued a statement of regret stating "We regret any distress or concern which was caused to students, parents and guardian of students or prospective students of the College, which includes those within the College community that are members of the LGBTIQA+ community, and their families and their allies". The school also made a donation of an undisclosed amount to an unnamed charity as part of the settlement.

=== 2022 employment contract controversy ===
In late March 2022, it was reported that the school was requiring teachers "to sign employment contracts that warn they could be sacked for being openly homosexual" and that at least one teacher had already resigned rather than sign it.

In response to the contract, Queensland attorney general, Shannon Fentiman, said “It is absolutely appalling to see these awful and damaging clauses in the employment contracts for Citipointe College teachers – especially after the recent outrage and controversy around their student enrolment forms”.

== Campus ==
Citipointe Christian College stands on a 2.40-square-kilometre (590-acre) campus that is shared with Citipointe Church Brisbane, Citipointe ChildCare, and Christian Heritage College (a private tertiary). It is situated in the south-eastern suburbs of Brisbane and is located between the suburbs of Carindale and Mansfield at the address 322 Wecker Road, Carindale 4152.

The "Citipointe Campus" includes:

- the school
- Citipointe Church
- Citipointe Christian College International (ELICOS Centre)
- a college of higher education (Christian Heritage College)
- a Bible college (Citipointe Ministry College)
- a daycare centre (Citipointe Child Care)

== Music ==
From 2012 to 2014, students at the college were picked as finalist in triple j's Unearthed High competition. These included Lauren Coutts, aka Azura; Jordan Hankins, aka Tyler Touché; and Vancouver Sleep Clinic, led by Tim Bettinson.

Violent Soho band members are also alumni of the school.

== Rankings ==
In 2020, Citipointe Christian College was ranked at 47th in the State of Queensland for Academic Results. Between 2012 and 2019, the school placed between a low of 103rd in the state (2018), and a high of 22nd (2012).

In 2022, Citipointe Christian College was ranked 2nd for National Assessment Program – Literacy and Numeracy (NAPLAN) results for primary schools in the State of Queensland, and the 14th for secondary schools.

== Enrolments and staff ==
The school had a population of around 1700 students from preparatory to Year 12, including students in the International College, as of 2008. There were over 200 staff members employed by the school in 2008.

== Notable alumni ==
- Alberto Campbell-Staines, Paralympian athlete and teacher's assistant at the school as of 2015
- Adrian Schrinner (1994), Lord Mayor of Brisbane as of 2022
- Band members of Violent Soho
