= Higher Education Support Act 2003 =

Parliament of Australia
- Long title: An Act relating to the funding of higher education, and for other purposes
- Citation: No. 149 of 2003 or No. 149, 2003 as amended
- Territorial extent: States and territories of Australia
- Royal assent: 19 December 2003
- Status: In force

The Higher Education Support Act 2003 (Cth) (HESA) is an Act of the Parliament of the Commonwealth of Australia which governs funding for universities in Australia. The Act determines categories of providers eligible for public funding, establishes the basis for providing public funding, codifies the existing aims of universities, and introduces measures to strengthen Australia’s knowledge base.

== Higher education providers ==
In order to participate in the National Competitive Grants Program, providers must be approved. The Act defines three groups of institutions.

=== Table A ===
Self accrediting bodies, eligible for all funding under the Act:

- Central Queensland University
- Charles Darwin University
- Charles Sturt University
- Curtin University of Technology
- Deakin University
- Edith Cowan University
- Griffith University
- James Cook University
- La Trobe University
- Macquarie University
- Monash University
- Murdoch University
- Queensland University of Technology
- RMIT University
- Southern Cross University
- Swinburne University of Technology
- The Australian National University
- The Flinders University of South Australia
- The University of Adelaide
- The University of Melbourne
- The University of Queensland
- The University of Sydney
- The University of Western Australia
- University of Ballarat
- University of Canberra
- University of Newcastle
- University of New England
- University of New South Wales
- The University of Notre Dame Australia
- University of South Australia
- University of Southern Queensland
- University of Tasmania
- University of Technology, Sydney
- University of the Sunshine Coast
- University of Western Sydney
- University of Wollongong
- Victoria University of Technology
- Australian Catholic University
- Australian Maritime College
- Batchelor Institute of Indigenous Tertiary Education

=== Table B ===
Self accrediting bodies, not eligible for general Commonwealth funded places. They are eligible for Commonwealth research funding and can be allocated national priority student places in fields such as nursing and education.

- Bond University
- University of Divinity
- Torrens University Australia

=== Table C ===
Providers approved by the Minister. These can be a university, an institution established with the powers to approve its own courses, or a provider whose courses have been accredited by the relevant State or Territory authority. They can be allocated national priority student places in fields such as nursing and education.

- Carnegie Mellon University, a non-profit organisation established under Pennsylvania law.
- University College London, a non-profit organisation established under United Kingdom law

== Job-Ready Graduates Package ==
In late 2020, the Morrison Government passed an amendment to the Act; the Higher Education Support Amendment (Job-Ready Graduates and Supporting Regional and Remote Students) Act 2020. The amendment changed the rates of private and public funding for different disciplines, while adding new Commonwealth Supported Places. The reforms were intended to drive greater enrolment growth in sectors where the Government anticipated greater jobs growth and opportunities, allow greater enrolment growth in regional areas, and add capacity in the system to account for population growth.

Professor in the Practice of Higher Education Policy at ANU, Andrew Norton highlighted three key flaws in the legislation; changes to student contributions won’t change student preferences, the new overall funding rates weaken university incentives, and the new Commonwealth contribution rates actually limit enrolment growth in the priority courses.

== See also ==
- Tertiary education in Australia
- List of universities in Australia
