= IPP-SHR =

International Program of Psycho-Social Health Research
- Established: 2006
- Location: Brisbane (Headquarters), Queensland, Australia
- Nickname: IPP-SHR

International Program of Psycho-Social Health Research (IPP-SHR) is an Australian research program based in Queensland which explores the psycho-social dimension of health through examining and reporting on the human experience of serious physical and mental illnesses.

== History ==
The International Program for Psycho Social Health was established in 2006 by A/Pr Pam McGrath as a research initiative funded by the National Health and Medical Research Council (NHMRC) and CQUniversity. In 2011, the International Program of Psycho-Social Health Research moved to Griffith Health Institute, Griffith University.

== Areas of research ==
IPP-SHR explores the psycho-social dimension of health through a wide range of topics including: palliative care; haematology/oncology; mental health; acute medicine; bioethics; rural and remote health; Indigenous health; spirituality; paediatrics; birth studies; and service delivery evaluation.

IPP-SHR also produces two industry focused publications including a quarterly review and a weekly podcast.
