= 160 Ann Street, Brisbane =

Office tower in Brisbane, Queensland

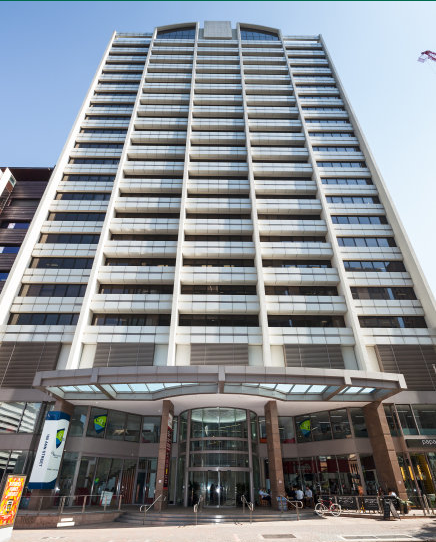
- 160 Ann Street, Brisbane

General information
- Type: Office tower
- Location: 160 Ann Street, Brisbane, 4000 Queensland
- Coordinates: 27°28′01.5″S 153°01′27.4″E
- Current tenants: CQU, Department of Health (Australia), Glencore Technology, Healthy Land & Water, Shine Lawyers, Suncorp Corporate Services.
- Completed: 1972
- Owner: CorVal
- Operator: CorVal Partners

Technical details
- Floor count: 23
- Floor area: 16,304 m^{2} (175,490 sq ft)

160 Ann Street, Brisbane is an office tower located in the heart of central business district (CBD) of Brisbane, Queensland in Australia and adjacent to the Brisbane River. After its completion in 1972, the tower was owned successively by Australian companies Zurich Australia Insurance, Precision Group, Investa Property Group, and CorVal Partners.

== History ==
Since its construction in 1972, 160 Ann Street, Brisbane has had various owners.

In November 1995, Zurich Australia, part of the Zurich Insurance Group, bought it for $41.75 million. In 2005 it sold the building to Precision Group who, in 2006, transferred it to the Investa Property Group as part of a property swap. Its present owners, CorVal Partners, acquired the building in 2012.

In 2009 a study of the building was carried out as part of a Solar Hearting & Cooling Programme of the International Energy Agency. It was funded by the Australian Research Council and "considered as a 'Critical Case' representing common physical and operational characteristics of typical high rise office buildings in Australia".

In 2011 Central Queensland University commenced its Brisbane campus in the building.
