= Regional Universities Network =

University network in Australia

- Formation: 2011
- Type: Public
- Location: Australia
- Members: 7
- Students: 185,000
- Website: www.run.edu.au

The Regional Universities Network (RUN) is a network of seven universities primarily from regional Australia, as well as campuses in the Australian capital cities and some international campuses.

== Members ==
Member universities
University	Location	State	Year of foundation	University Status	THE World University Rankings 2021	ARWU World University Rankings 2020	QS World University Rankings 2021
Charles Sturt University	Albury-Wodonga, Bathurst, Dubbo, Goulburn, Orange, Port Macquarie, Wagga Wagga	NSW	1895	1989	801-1000	N/A	1000+
Central Queensland University	Bundaberg, Gladstone, Mackay, Rockhampton, Sydney and Brisbane	QLD	1967	1992	801-1000	N/A	N/A
Federation University	Ballarat, Ararat, Horsham, Stawell, and Churchill	VIC	1870	1994	801-1000	N/A	N/A
Southern Cross University	Coffs Harbour, Lismore, Tweed Heads	NSW	1970	1994	601-800	901-1000	N/A
University of New England (Australia)	Armidale	NSW	1938	1954	N/A	501-600	959
University of Southern Queensland	Toowoomba, Springfield, and Ipswich	QLD	1967	1992	501-600	801-900	N/A
University of the Sunshine Coast	Sunshine Coast	QLD	1994	1994	601-800	801-900	N/A

== History ==
The Regional Universities Network was formed in October 2011 as a response to the regional focus for higher education of Australian government. Many of these universities were part of a previous group, known as the "New Generation Universities". The current Chairperson of the Network is Professor Nick Klomp, of Central Queensland University.

On 29 May 2019, Charles Sturt University has announced it will join the Regional Universities Network (RUN), becoming the seventh member of the group.

The Members of this group are:

- Central Queensland University
- Charles Sturt University
- Federation University Australia
- Southern Cross University
- University of New England
- University of Southern Queensland
- University of the Sunshine Coast

== Map ==
Locations of each RUN member’s main campus

== See also ==
- List of universities in Australia
- Group of Eight
- Australian Technology Network
- Innovative Research Universities Australia
- Australian Vice-Chancellors' Committee
