= Innovative Research Universities =

University network in Australia

- Abbreviation: IRU
- Established: 2003
- Location: Australia
- Members: 8
- Chair: Carolyn Evans
- Website: www.iru.edu.au

Innovative Research Universities (IRU), formerly Innovative Research Universities Australia, is a network of eight comprehensive universities in Australia.

The main purpose of the group is to undertake advocacy on issues related to higher education policy, research and university students.

The IRU has eight university members: Charles Darwin University, James Cook University, Griffith University, La Trobe University, Flinders University, Murdoch University, Western Sydney University and the University of Canberra. Between them, the universities enrol over 238,000 students including around 55,000 international students.

The IRU is one of the four main university groupings in Australia. The other groups are Australian Technology Network, Group of Eight and Regional Universities Network.

== History ==
In 2003, a group of universities sharing common origins established the Innovative Research Universities a collaborative network to enhance the outcomes of higher education. The members were established as research-intensive universities during the 1960s and 1970s.

The founding six universities were: Flinders University, Griffith University, La Trobe University, Macquarie University, Murdoch University and The University of Newcastle. James Cook University joined in 2007, followed by Charles Darwin University in 2009. These additions were balanced as first Macquarie (2008) and then Newcastle (2014) left the group to pursue their futures independently. In 2017, Western Sydney University joined, followed by the University of Canberra in 2021.

== Members ==
Member universities
University	Location	State	Year of foundation	University Status	THE World University Rankings 2022	ARWU World University Rankings 2021	QS World University Rankings 2021
Charles Darwin University	Darwin, Katherine, Alice Springs, Palmerston, Sydney	NT	1974	2003	501-600	901-1000	701-750
Flinders University	Adelaide	SA	1966	1966	251-300	401-500	407
Griffith University	Gold Coast, Nathan, Mount Gravatt, South Bank, Logan	QLD	1971	1971	201-250	201-300	303
James Cook University	Townsville, Cairns, Mackay, Mount Isa, Thursday Island, Rockhampton, Brisbane, Singapore	QLD	1961	1970	251-300	201-300	462
La Trobe University	Melbourne, Albury-Wodonga, Bendigo, Mildura, Shepparton	VIC	1964	1964	201-500	301-400	398
Murdoch University	Perth, Mandurah, Rockingham, Singapore, Dubai	WA	1973	1973	501-600	501-600	571-580
University of Canberra	Canberra	ACT	1967	1990	170	701-800	456
Western Sydney University	Bankstown, Blacktown, Campbelltown, Hawkesbury, Liverpool, Parramatta, Penrith	NSW	1891	2001	201-250	301-400	474

== Research ==
All members of the IRU are ranked between 170 and 540 in the Times Higher Education World University Rankings 2021. Five IRU universities are also ranked in the global top 100 in the Times Higher Education Impact Ranking 2021. The group collectively attracts A$415 million per annum in research funding from national research agencies, industry and public sector agencies including local and state governments. The members are core partners in half of all Australian Co-operative Research Centres (CRCs). The CRC Program links researchers with industry and government, and emphasises research application.

== Map ==
Locations of each IRU member's main campus

== See also ==
- Universities in Australia
- Universities Australia
- Australian Technology Network
- Golden Triangle (English universities)
- C9 League, alliance of top universities in China
- National Institutes of Technology (Indian engineering universities)
- Group of Eight
- Regional Universities Network
