= Australian Technology Network =

University network in Australia

- Formation: 1999
- Headquarters: Melbourne, Victoria
- Region served: Australia
- Members: List: Curtin Deakin RMIT Newcastle UTS
- Chair: Professor Alex Zelinsky AO
- Website: www.atn.edu.au

The Australian Technology Network (ATN) is a network of five Australian universities, with a strong history of innovation, enterprise and working closely with industry. ATN traces its origins back to 1975 as the Directors of Central Institutes of Technology (DOCIT), and was revived in 1999 in its present form with changes to its membership announced in 2018, 2020, 2021 and 2023.

ATN is the second largest university grouping in Australia, in terms of student numbers and research funding.

== History ==
The ATN originated in 1975 as the "Directors of Central Institutes of Technology (DOCIT)", a conference group consisting of the directors of Australia's leading "institutes of technology". Each of DOCIT's original member institutions (NSWIT, QIT, RMIT, SAIT and WAIT (Note: Predecessors to University of Technology Sydney, Queensland University of Technology, RMIT University, University of South Australia, and Curtin University of Technology respectively.)) were located in the central business district of their respective state's capital city, hence they were deemed "central institutes of technology".

DOCIT founded its original member institutes' distinctiveness on their size (they enrolled almost one third of all full-time advanced education students), on the advanced level of their teaching (most of their programs were degrees rather than the diplomas like that of other advanced education institutions) and their conduct of applied research (DEET, 1993:18). They were therefore like a "technology-focused" group.

DOCIT encountered too much opposition to its aspirations, and disbanded in 1982. The conference group was later revived in 1999 as the Australian Technology Network, consisting of: the Curtin University of Technology, Queensland University of Technology, Royal Melbourne Institute of Technology, University of South Australia and University of Technology Sydney. Each ATN member university was granted public university status between 1986 and 1992, however their antecedents make them some of the oldest tertiary institutions in Australia.

QUT departed ATN on 28 September 2018.

Deakin University was announced as a new ATN member on 8 December 2020, bringing the Network's membership back up to five universities and making the network Australia's second largest university grouping in terms of student numbers and research funding. Deakin's membership bolsters ATN's geographic footprint with a presence in the regional gateway city of Geelong and regional Victoria.

In November 2021, the University of Newcastle joined the Australian Technology Network as an Associate Member, becoming the sixth member of the network. Newcastle's membership further enhanced ATN's regional footprint into the Central Coast and Hunter regions. The University of Newcastle became a full member in 2023.

== Membership ==
=== Current members ===
Locations of ATN universities

University	City	State	Established	University Status	THE World University Rankings 2026	Academic Ranking of World Universities 2025	QS World University Rankings 2026
Curtin University	Perth	WA	1902	1986	251–300	201–300	183
Deakin University	Melbourne	VIC	1887	1974	201–250	201-300	=207
RMIT University	Melbourne	VIC	1887	1992	251–300	301–400	125
University of Newcastle	Newcastle	NSW	1951	1965	251–300	401–500	=227
University of Technology Sydney	Sydney	NSW	1964	1988	=145	201–300	96

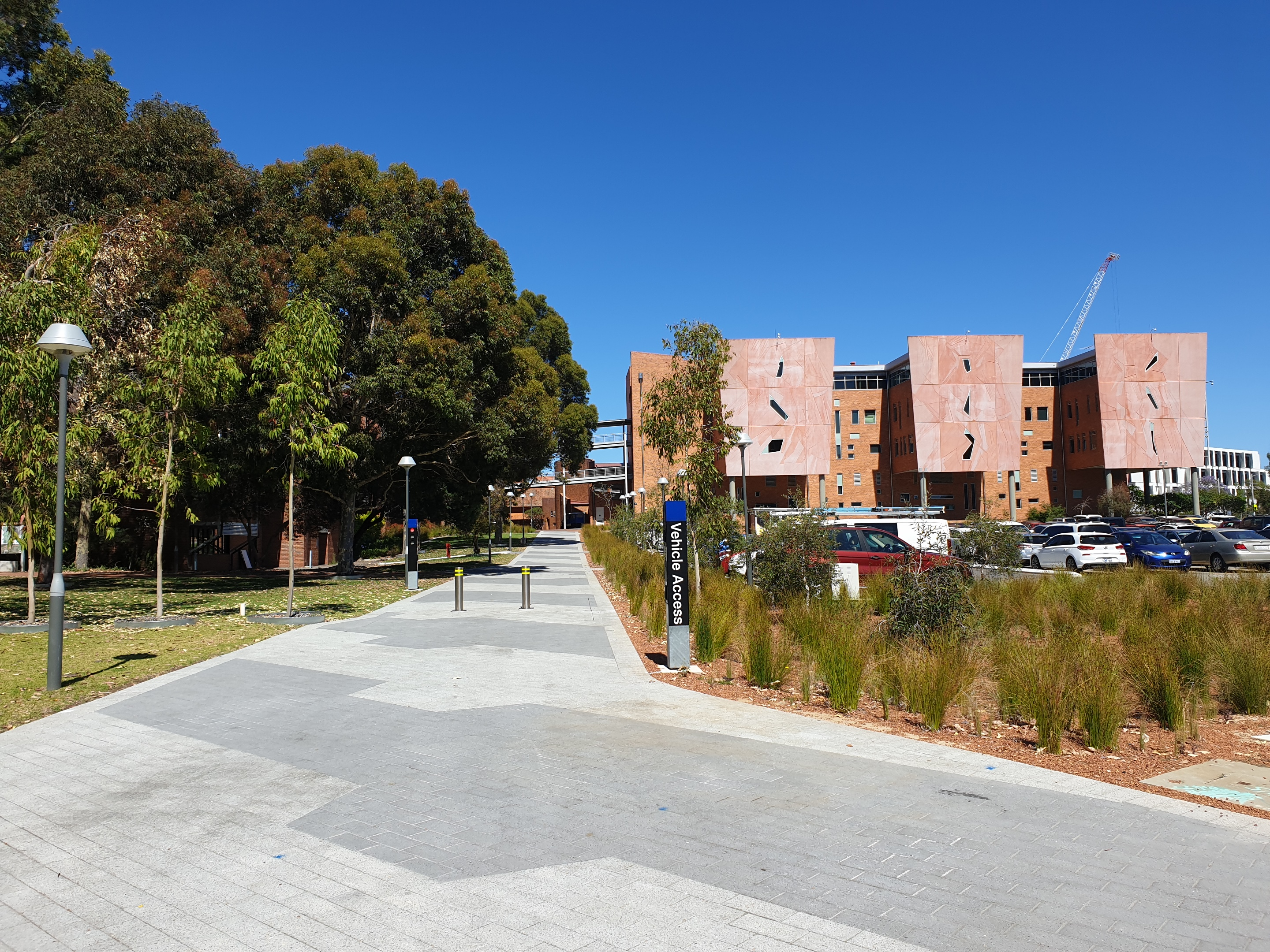
Curtin University, Perth

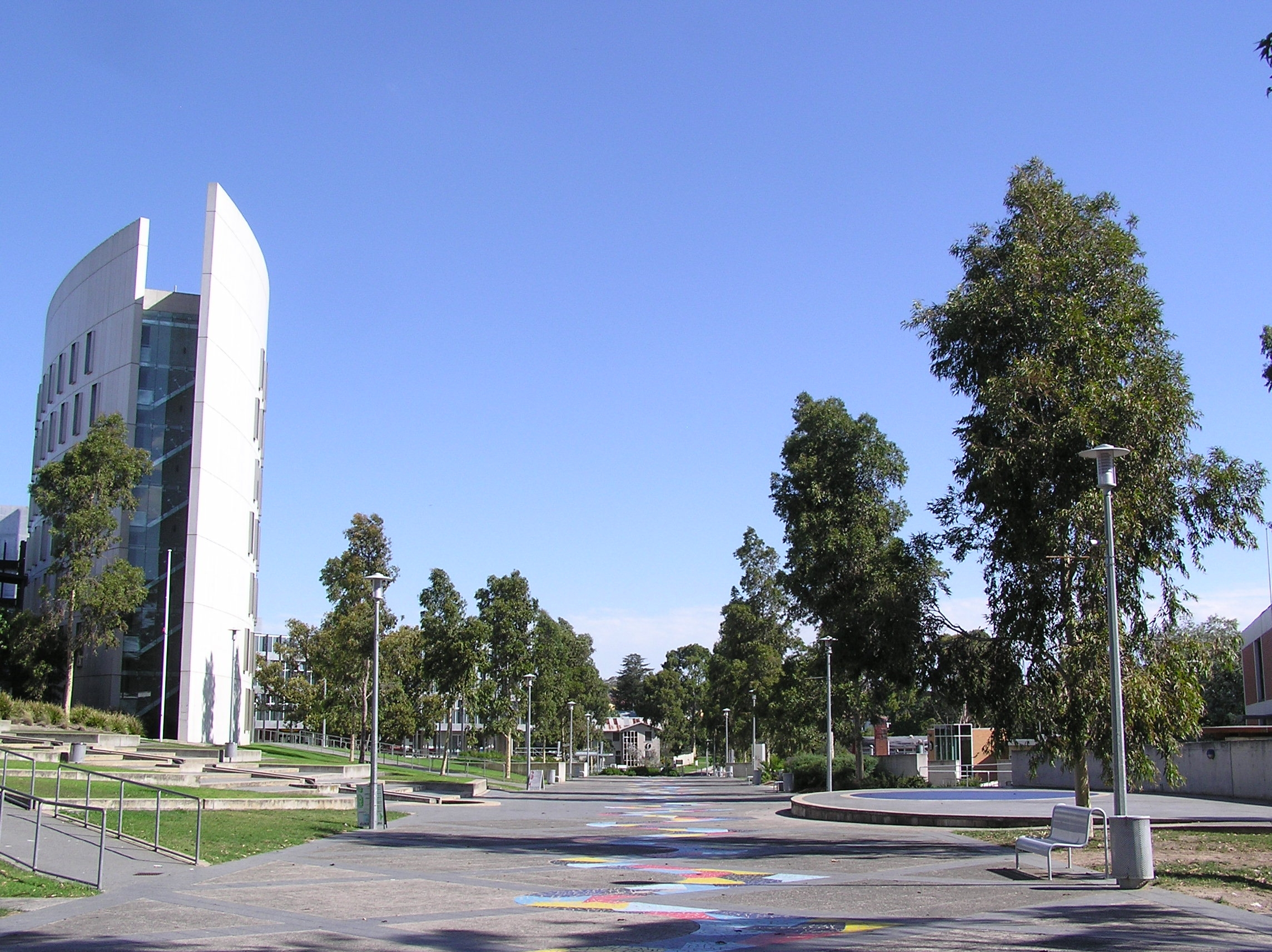
Deakin University, Melbourne

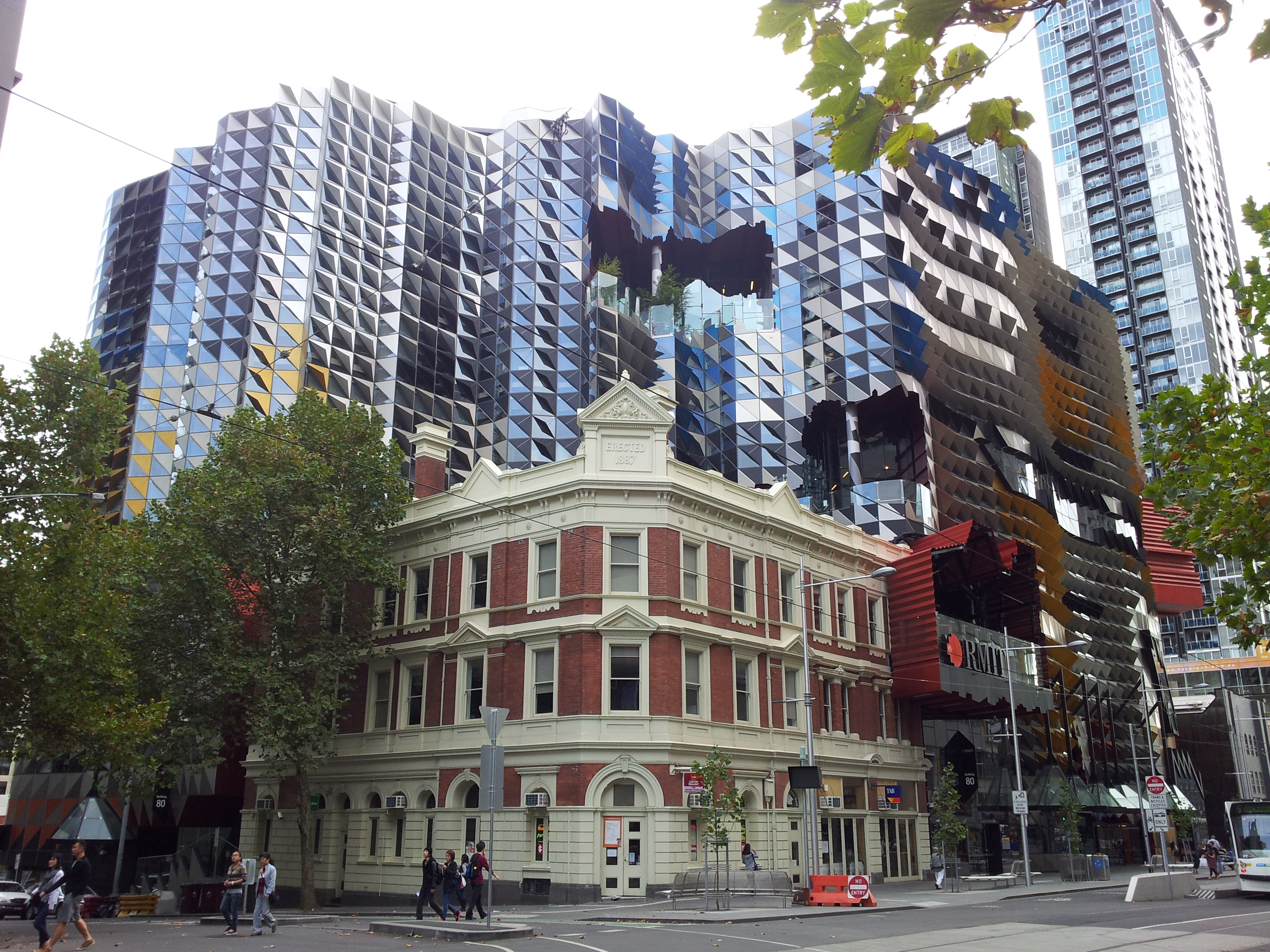
RMIT University, Melbourne

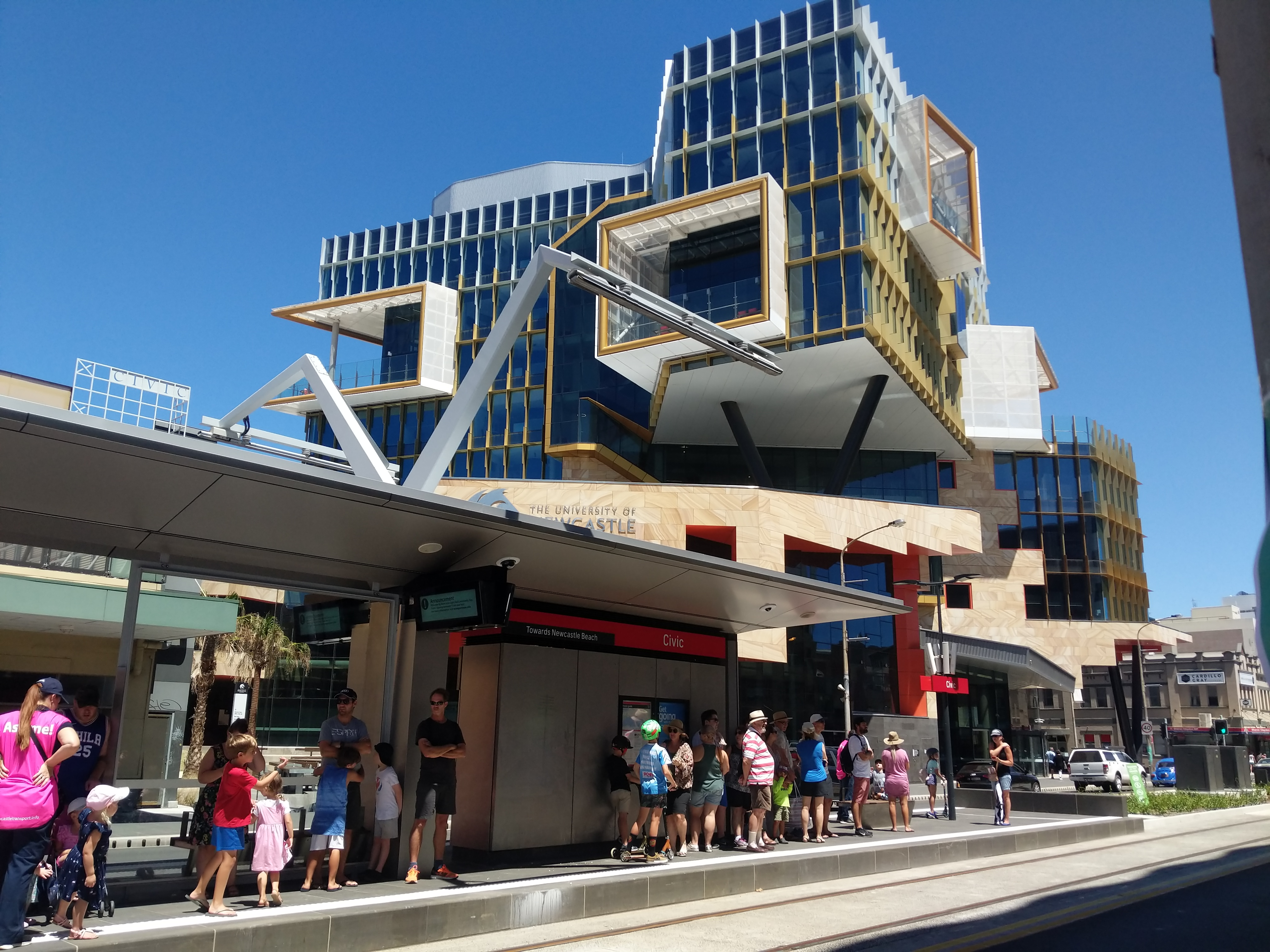
University of Newcastle, Newcastle

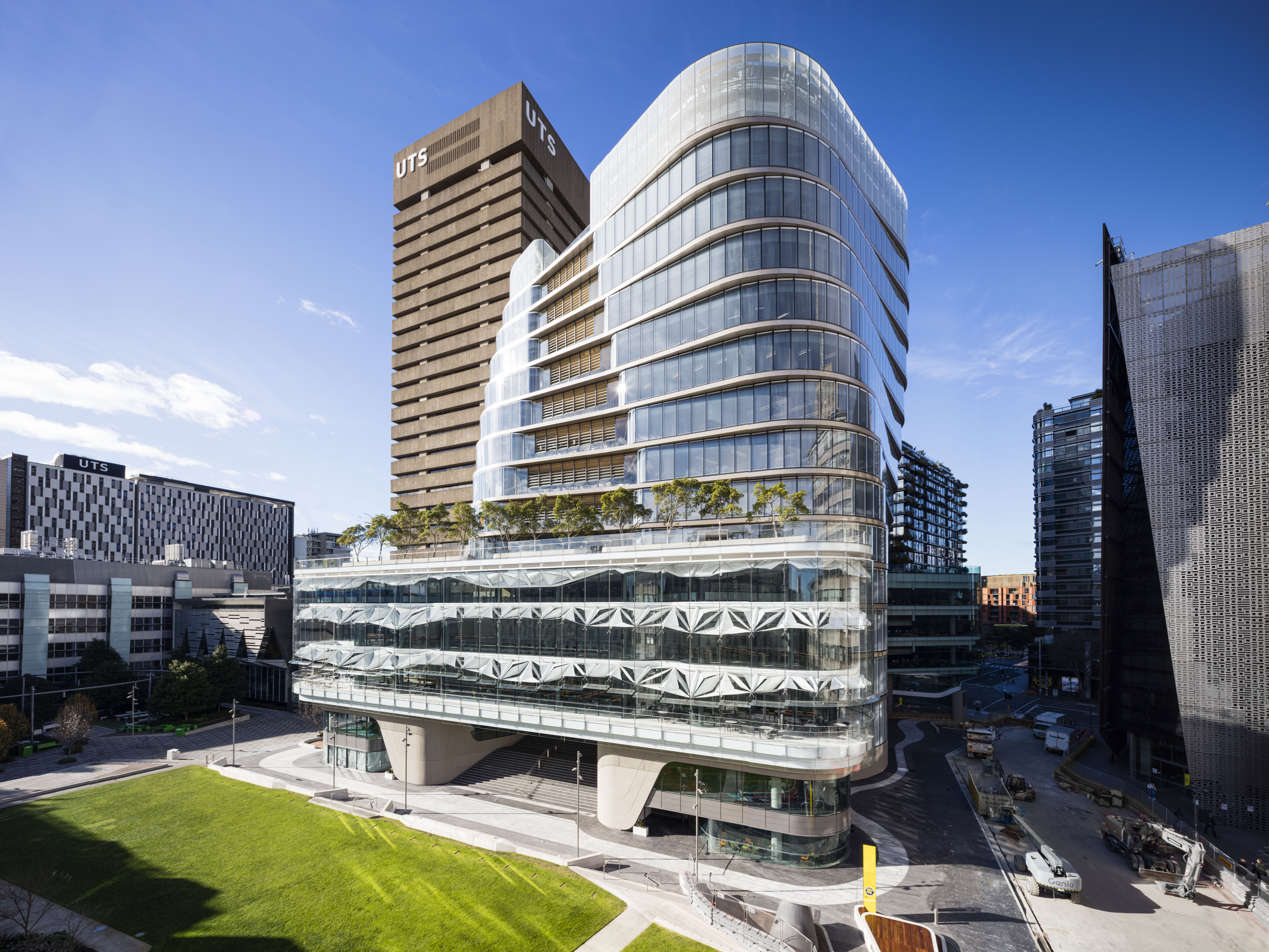
University of Technology Sydney, Sydney

=== Former members ===
University	City	State	Established	University Status	Left
Queensland University of Technology	Brisbane	QLD	1908	1989	2018
University of South Australia	Adelaide	SA	1856	1991	2025

== See also ==
- List of universities in Australia
- Group of Eight
- Innovative Research Universities Australia
- Regional Universities Network
- Association of American Universities
- C9 League
- Russell Group
- National Institutes of Technology
- TU9
- U15 Group of Canadian Research Universities
