= Nick Klomp =

Australian academic administrator

Nicholas Klomp is an Australian academic. Since February 2019, he has served as vice-chancellor and president of Central Queensland University.

== Education ==
Klomp holds a Bachelor of Applied Science degree from Curtin University, First Class Honours from Murdoch University and a PhD in Environmental Science from the University of Glasgow.

== Career ==
Prior to his appointment as vice-chancellor, Klomp was the deputy Vice-Chancellor (Academic) at the University of Canberra and prior to that role, Klomp was the dean of the Faculty of Science at Charles Sturt University.

In addition to his extensive teaching career, Klomp was a science correspondent for ABC radio for over 10 years and has produced two books and over 60 refereed publications.

Klomp sits on the Regional Universities Australia Vice-Chancellor's group and has openly voiced his passion on the importance of regional education in Australia
