= Appleton Institute =

Multidisciplinary research hub in Australia

Coordinates: 34°56′31″S 138°35′27″E

The Appleton Institute is a multidisciplinary research hub residing within the Adelaide campus of CQUniversity Australia, located south of the Adelaide CBD, in Wayville, South Australia. Formerly the Centre for Sleep Research, the Appleton Institute was established as part of CQUniversity in January 2012. The institute is overseen by Professor Drew Dawson, an expert in fatigue and human factors, and was named after the late Dr. Arthur Appleton, the first Vice-Chancellor of CQUniversity, who had strong ties to South Australia.

The Appleton Institute was formed from the research group Professor Dawson first established at the University of Adelaide in 1992. Since then, it has grown to become the largest behavioural sleep and fatigue research groups in Australia and has broadened its expertise to include safety science, human factors and safety management, applied psychology, human-animal interaction and cultural anthropology. In 2013, a brand new sleep laboratory was opened with 6 bedrooms and time-isolation capabilities, allowing data to be collected on sleep, fatigue and performance.
