= Leslie Weston (scientist) =

Plant Biologist

Leslie A. Weston
- Born: Buffalo, New York USA
- Education: Cornell University, Michigan State University
- Occupation: Professor
- Employer: Charles Sturt University
- Known for: Plant Biology
- Title: Professor
- Website: https://researchoutput.csu.edu.au/en/persons/7a27148a-466a-4ede-9602-00645209a4e1

Leslie A. Weston FAA, is a plant biologist, who was awarded a Fellow of the Australian Academy of Science in 2023, for her work on weed suppressing ground covers and pest management. She is a professor at Charles Sturt University, at Wagga Wagga, and researches botany, agronomy, weed control and horticulture.

== Career and education ==
Weston received a Bachelor of Plant Science at Cornell University (1980) and a Masters and PhD (1986) at Michigan State University. She has worked at both Cornell University, and the University of Kentucky in the Department of Plant Science and Horticulture. She has more than 30 years of experience researching agronomy and horticulutural crop production, as well as weed science, plant protection, invasion biology, herbicide discovery, metabolomics and plant toxicity.

After her PhD and work in the USA, she moved to Australia, and works at Charles Sturt University, researching and publishing on the fields of plant biology, botany and weed control. Weston was awarded $23 million for a dung beetle project, in 2019. She also worked on a dung beetle project which was a joint venture between CSIRO and Meat and Livestock Australia.

Weston was also a past president of the International Allelopathy Society. She also holds patents for plant biology bioherbicides which suppress weeds in turf and grasses, working towards a lawn which ‘weeds itself’. She has expertise in the biology and ecology of invasive species and their impact, in particular, their long-term impact on Australian ecosystems. At Charles Sturt University, she manages the Plant Interactions Research Group, with over 20 staff and students.

Weston was elected a Fellow of the Australian Academy of Science for her work in delivering more sustainable outcomes in the field of agriculture. Weston is ‘a pioneer in the study and application of plant interactions with other plants, microbes and herbivores’.

In her statement for the Academy of Sciences, Weston stated that she is "especially excited to be one of the first women working at a regional university with an agricultural focus to be elected a Fellow". She said that she hopes to "use my activities as a Fellow to inspire other women and those working in agriculture to continue to persevere in their research interests and contributions to agricultural systems".

== Publications ==
Weston has over 12,148 citations of her work, and an H-index of 52, as at May 2023. Her most cited publications, as at May 2023, include the following publications:

- C Bertin, X Yang, LA Weston (2003) The role of root exudates and allelochemicals in the rhizosphere. Plant and soil 256, 67–83.
- LA Weston (1996) Utilization of allelopathy for weed management in agroecosystems. Agronomy journal 88 (6), 860-866.
- LA Weston, U Mathesius (2013) Flavonoids: their structure, biosynthesis and role in the rhizosphere, including allelopathy. Journal of chemical ecology 39, 283–297.

== Recognition & awards ==
- 2023 – Fellow of the Australian Academy of Science.
- 2017 - Recipient of the Grodzinsky Award, International Allelopathy Society for Outstanding Publication.
- 2005 – Recipient of the Molisch Award, International Allelopathy Society for Outstanding Research Contributions.
