= Healthy Land & Water =

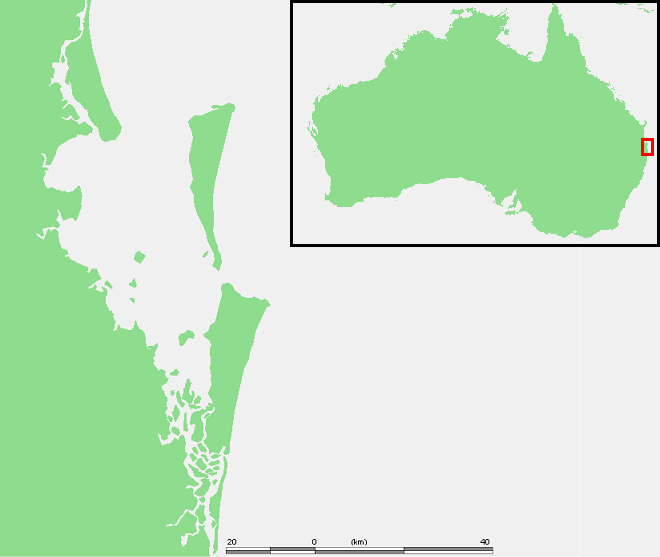
Moreton Bay

Healthy Land and Water Limited is the natural resource management (NRM) body for South East Queensland, of which there are 12 NRM bodies across Queensland and 54 across Australia.

Healthy Land & Water's core focus is investing in and deploying environmental initiatives to build the prosperity, liveability, and sustainability of South East Queensland.

Healthy Land & Water aims to increase environmental health using science, data, actions and advice to preserve and enhance the region's natural assets and support a healthy, resilient region into the future.

The body does research, monitoring, evaluation and project management. It has contributed to many projects to restore waterways and landscapes, improve native habitats, manage weeds, protect native species, inform policy, and educate communities on the ways to improve and protect the environment.

Healthy Land & Water is an independent, not-for-profit body. The Australian Government, Queensland Government, local councils, water utilities and industry co-fund the organisation to deliver projects for the region’s rivers and catchments with the stated aim of guiding on-ground rehabilitation efforts.

== Regional plans & environmental reporting for South East Queensland ==
Healthy Land & Water is the custodian of two core environmental resources for South East Queensland:

- South East Queensland Natural Resource Management Plan 2009-2031
- South East Queensland Environmental Report Card

== Building resilience against threats ==
The region is under pressure from a rapidly increasing population and climate change. The data shows that more investment and effort is needed to halt and reverse the current rate of decline in the region's natural assets.

SEQ’s rapidly increasing population brings with it intensifying land use change, and increasing efforts to ensure that our environment can keep pace with development is needed to retain the natural beauty and liveability that attracts people to work, live and visit this beautiful part of Australia. Demands for more housing and resources impacts on the connectedness of the region’s forests and on its rich biodiversity.

At the same time, climate change is bringing more frequent and more intense disaster events such as flooding and fire.

Long-term data shows that to protect South East Queensland's natural beauty and environmental significance, and ensure its ongoing sustainability, liveability and prosperity depends on the health of the region's natural assets.

== What they do ==
According to Healthy Land & Water, their work involves:

1. Informing policy, actions & investment to improve the environment: Healthy Land & Water is the custodian of 25+ years of data and expertise which is used by governments setting policy, communities deciding action, and corporate investors seeking genuine sustainable investment options.
2. Science & research: Research, monitoring and data analysis is used to help people understand the condition and threats to their environs to ensure the sustainable use of the natural environment.
3. Onground action: Healthy Land & Water deploys projects and initiatives to restore waterways and landscapes, improve native habitats, manage weeds, protect native species and improve the sustainability and liveability of landscapes, built environs and urban areas.
4. Collaboration & partnerships: Bringing together multi-faceted collaborations and partnerships to co-create and leverage outcomes utilising big data, and on-ground experience. This includes Traditional Owners, government, private industry, utilities, landholders and the community.
5. Training & capacity building: Providing training and development workshops, awareness-raising campaigns and capacity-building activities to educate and empower people and communities on the best ways to improve and protect the environment.

== Activities ==
The organisation's activities include:

- Water quality improvement: The organisation works to improve water quality in the SEQ region, particularly in rivers, creeks, and catchment areas. It has implemented various strategies to reduce pollution, sediment runoff, and contaminants entering waterways.
- Land rehabilitation: Healthy Land & Water is involved in land rehabilitation projects, restoring degraded landscapes and ecosystems. This includes re-vegetation efforts, erosion control, and the promotion of sustainable agriculture and land use practices.
- Biodiversity conservation: The organisation has contributed to projects aimed at conserving native flora and fauna and threatened species.
- Community engagement: Healthy Land & Water has active outreach and community engagement programs. The organisation works to raise awareness, educate, and involve the local community in environmental stewardship, with a focus on sustainable practices and conservation.
- Research and monitoring: The organisation conducts research and monitoring activities to better understand environmental challenges in the region. This information is used to guide conservation and restoration efforts.
- Collaboration and partnerships: Healthy Land & Water collaborates with a large number of stakeholders, including government agencies, local councils, farmers, community groups, First Nations groups, and other environmental organisations to achieve its objectives and leverage collective impact.

== Priorities ==
Healthy Land & Water updated its Strategic Plan in 2022. Its 5-year mission is to 'deliver an environment for future generations to thrive'.

The organisation outlines its strategic priorities as:

1. Directing investment into South East Queensland's environmental future:
  - Developing a platform for informed investment to improve targeting environmental works to where it is most needed in South East Queensland.
  - Shaping and delivering strategies towards a more sustainable region.
  - Directing investment using its expertise in natural resource management, environmental health and creating resilient regions.
2. Delivering transformative environmental & community change:
  - Advocating for the environment and championing evidence-based investment to support environmental health, resilience and liveability in South East Queensland.
  - Connecting people with targeted, innovative and impactful on-ground works that improve the environment.
  - Acting as an independent and trusted partner, bringing environmental credibility to those who collaborate to achieve impactful outcomes for the region.
3. Creating connections between people, place & culture
  - Bringing strong multi-faceted partnerships together.
  - Growing the network of partners who advocate and co-invest in environmental health and the liveability of the region.

== Tourism ==
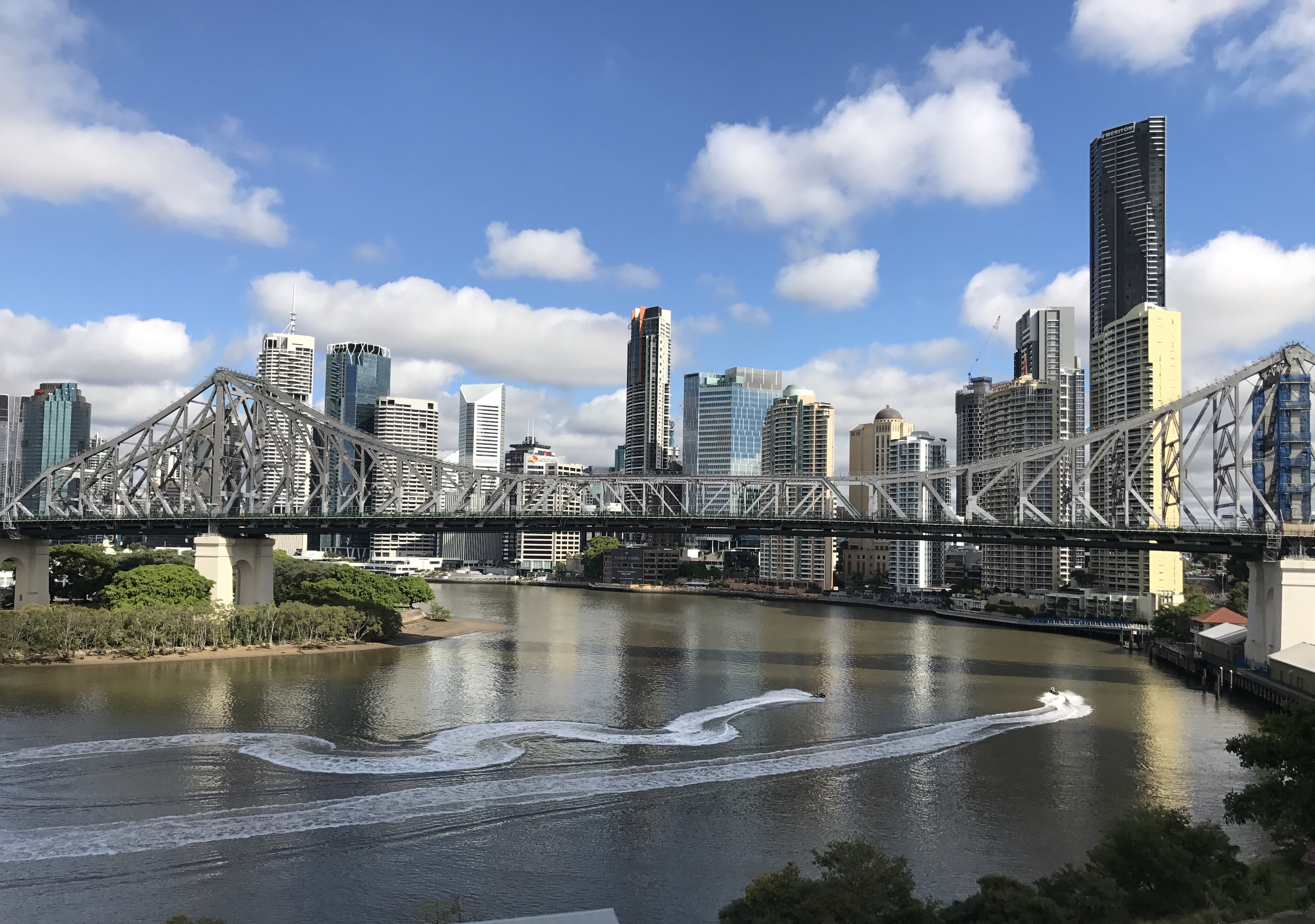
Brisbane River

Much of South East Queensland's tourism is centred around the region's biodiversity, waterways and ecosystems. South East Queensland generates ~$40 billion in ecosystem service value annually. Moreton Bay provides ~$7 Billion annually.

The South East Queensland region is made up of 14 major river catchments and covers an area of around 23,000 km^{2}. stretching from Noosa in the north to the Gold Coast in the south and west to the Great Dividing Range.

The region is a biodiversity hotspot with unique and ecologically important areas, including Moreton Bay, Ramsar Wetlands, two adjoining UNESCO Biosphere Reserves (Noosa and the Sunshine Coast), and many outstanding natural assets. These areas are not only of immense environmental value but are also essential to the region's local economies, cultural heritage and resilience.

== History ==
Healthy Land & Water's history stretches back to the 1990s. It is the culmination of several mergers between natural resource management groups servicing the South East Queensland region over time.

It took the name Healthy Land & Water Limited in 2016, after the merger of two predecessor bodies that had been servicing the South East Queensland region:

- SEQ Catchments (2005-2016): Whose primary focus was on improving grazing, reducing erosion, repairing waterways, managing pests and weeds, restoring degraded habitats and looking after coastal areas.
- Healthy Waterways (2001-2016): Whose primary focus was on the health and sustainability of waterways, particularly in the context of the South East Queensland region. It played a significant role in managing and improving the water quality, biodiversity, and overall health of rivers, creeks, and other aquatic ecosystems.

The decline of Natural Resource Management (NRM) funding over time in Australia has been a significant factor contributing to the contraction of NRM bodies across Australia. Just prior to the strategic merger of these two bodies in South East Queensland, Healthy Waterways' income was halved in 2015, falling to $488,659. SEQ Catchments experienced an $835,142 loss over the same period.

Healthy Land & Water's business model includes strategies to increase funding for environmental works in the region, by developing nature-based investment initiatives which corporate partners can co-invest in to demonstrate their commitment to environmental sustainability.

== SEQ Catchments Members Association (SEQCMA) ==
SEQ Catchments Members Association (SEQCMA) was created in 2005 by the South East Queensland Council of Mayors to collaborate and involve the community in managing natural resources.

It is an alliance between community, government and industry focused on finding solutions to issues affecting South East Queensland’s environment. The association’s purpose is to bring many elements of the community together as one loud voice in the fight to improve and protect the region's lands, forests, bushland, waterways, wetlands and coastal regions.

It has over 200 members, including members from catchment and landcare groups, agriculture, tourism and local government bodies, Traditional Owners and community members.

SEQCMA is an owner/member of Healthy Land & Water and works closely with project teams to identify and develop solutions that build resilience into the region's landscapes and waterways.

SEQCMA members have a say on management planning, prioritisation of activity and funding of projects in order to meet the long-term targets detailed in the SEQ Natural Resource Management Plan 2009-2031.

== Ecosystem health monitoring & public Report Card ==
The organisation produces an annual report card which measures the health of individual catchments from year to year.

In 2016 the report found about 15,000 dump trucks' worth of sediment enters south-east Queensland's waterways every year, with sediment pollution the number one pressure on catchments. This figure increases exponentially during extreme flood events.

The report measures how much mud and rubbish (sediment and pollution) is entering waterways. This has highlighted the need to reduce sediment runoff in South East Queensland's rural and urban areas. The Ecosystem Health Report Card analyses data from 135 freshwater and 254 estuarine and marine sites across south-east Queensland. Grades ranging from 'A for excellent' to 'F for fail' are assigned to 19 catchments and 18 estuaries, as well as nine zones within Moreton Bay.

Approaches taken by South-East Queensland stakeholders to ensure healthier waterways and increased investment in water infrastructure have involved researchers from across leading universities working together to guide Queensland’s water future through scientific discovery, technological innovation and policy development.

== Queensland Fire & Biodiversity Consortium ==
The Queensland Fire and Biodiversity Consortium (QFBC) is a program of Healthy Land & Water.

The QFBC is a collaborative network of land managers and stakeholders who are committed to improving fire and biodiversity management, supporting applied fire research, facilitating partnerships and building land manager and landholder capacity.

Through education, community engagement and applied research, the QFBC builds the capacity of land managers and private landowners across Queensland.

== South East Queensland Natural Resource Management Plan 2009-2031 ==
Communities from across the region come together to develop and update a plan which balances the array of competing environmental, economic, social and cultural factors, as well as current and emerging opportunities, to guide collaborative strategies and actions to produce benefits for the whole community. These are documented in the South East Queensland Natural Resource Management Plan 2009-2031.

This document is updated every five years to address changing threats and priorities.
