= Charles Sturt University =

Public university in Australia

- Coat of arms
- Former names: List: Bathurst Experiment Farm (1895–1951); Bathurst Teachers' College (1951–1969); Mitchell College of Advanced Education (1970–1989); Riverina College of Advanced Education (1971–1985); Riverina-Murray Institute of Higher Education (1985–1989)
- Motto: For the public good
- Type: Public research university
- Established: 1895 (experiment farm); 1951 (tertiary college); 1989 (university status)
- Accreditation: TEQSA
- Academic affiliations: RUN; ACU; OUA
- Budget: A$571.02 million (2023)
- Visitor: Governor of New South Wales (ex officio)
- Chancellor: Michele Allan
- Vice-Chancellor: Renée Leon
- Academic staff: 821 (FTE, 2023)
- Administrative staff: 1,266 (FTE, 2023)
- Total staff: 2,087 (FTE, 2023)
- Students: 34,894 (2023)
- Location: New South Wales, Australia
- Campus: Urban and regional with multiple sites
- Named after: Charles Sturt
- Colours: Ochre
- Sporting affiliations: UniSport; EAEN
- Mascot: Charlie the Cockatoo
- Website: csu.edu.au

Charles Sturt University is an Australian multi-campus public university located in New South Wales, Australian Capital Territory and Victoria. Established in 1989, it was named in honour of Captain Charles Sturt, a British explorer who made expeditions into regional New South Wales and South Australia.

It is the largest regional university in Australia, offering a multidisciplinary spectrum of courses in collaboration with various partners across the country.

== History ==
The university was established on 1 July 1989 from the merger of several existing separately-administered Colleges of Advanced Education by the Charles Sturt University Act 1989 (Act No. 76, 1989).

The constituent colleges included the Mitchell College of Advanced Education in Bathurst, the Riverina-Murray Institute of Higher Education in Albury-Wodonga, and in Wagga Wagga.

The Riverina Murray Institute of Education operated between 1984 and 1989 in Albury-Wodonga and Wagga Wagga. Its predecessor was the Riverina College of Advanced Education established in 1972 as a result of the reformation of Wagga Teachers' College and later merger with Wagga Agricultural College in 1976. Wagga Teachers' College had been established in 1947 on the site of the former WW2 R.A.A.F. Hospital in the city of Wagga Wagga. In September 1949 the Wagga Agricultural College was opened on the site of the Experiment Farm established in October 1892 by the NSW Department of Agriculture with the first students commencing their studies in 1896.

The Bathurst Teachers' College was officially opened in November 1951 with the first students commencing in March of that year. It was established on the site of the Bathurst Experiment Farm established in 1895 with the first students commencing their studies in March 1897. Bathurst Teachers' College closed on 31 December 1967 and the Mitchell College of Advanced Education was established on 1 January 1970.

Goulburn Teachers’ College opened on 1 July 1970 and became a CAE in 1974. It operated until 1982 when it was dissolved and became the Goulburn campus of Riverina College of Advanced Education. In December 1983 it was announced by the NSW State Government that a new Police Academy would be established on the Goulburn campus. In 1984 the Goulburn campus was vacated and the staff and students were transferred to the Albury and Wagga campuses of the Riverina College of Advanced Education together with its Commonwealth funded student places.

Charles Sturt established a Study Centre in Sydney in 1998 and in Melbourne in 2007. These Study Centres were operated by a private education group called Study Group Australia. On 31 December 2022, Charles Sturt let its relationship with Study Group Australia expire. According to Charles Sturt's website, the Brisbane Study Centre is closed, and courses at the Sydney and Melbourne locations are in teach-out mode.

In 1998, the Goulburn campus was established to deliver policing education to New South Wales Police.

In 1999, the Dubbo campus foundation stone was laid. The university also launched its China Joint Cooperation Program with four universities in China.

On 1 January 2005, Charles Sturt assumed control of its Orange campus. The Orange Agricultural College was established in 1973 as a part of the NSW Department of Agriculture. As a consequence of the reorganisation of higher education in the late 1980s, the college was linked with the University of New England in 1990, then amalgamated with the University of Sydney on 1 January 1994. Although a part of the university, it remained the Orange Agricultural College until it was restructured as the Faculty of Rural Management in 2000. In 2005 the faculty became a part of Charles Sturt University, operating on the old college site in Orange. One of the conditions when the Department of Agriculture handed over the Orange Agricultural College was that the land would be used for the purposes for which it was originally intended.

Between 2005 and 2015, the university had expanded to include an offshore campus in Burlington, Ontario, in Canada. In July 2015, Charles Sturt ceased to operate its Ontario campus due to the legislative and regulatory environment in Ontario.

In 2005, Charles Sturt responded to the shortage of veterinarians in rural and regional Australia with the first veterinary science students starting their degrees at the Wagga Wagga campus. In 2008, the university also offered dentistry courses for the first time. This led to the development of five community-based clinics across its regional campuses.

On 14 February 2011, Charles Sturt University changed its logo. The Sturt's desert pea flower (Swainsona formosa) was stylised and made prominent, with the full name of the university as part of its logo.

On 1 May 2012, a milestone was reached as the university opened a new campus in Port Macquarie, its first coastal regional campus, making higher education accessible to the Port Macquarie-Hastings region.

In 2013, the university implemented a gas engine cogeneration power plant to help minimise fuel costs and carbon emissions.

On 18 April 2016, staff and students at the Port Macquarie campus moved into the first stage of their purpose-built campus. The second stage was completed in 2020 and included a New South Wales emergency services training room, an innovation hub, and student support facilities. The third stage is scheduled for completion over the coming years, with an expected student intake of 5,000 by 2030.

On 28 July 2016, Charles Sturt was declared Australia's First Official Carbon Neutral University. The Government of Australia's Carbon Neutral Program certified the university as "carbon neutral" against the National Carbon Offset Standard.

On 9 May 2018, Charles Sturt and Western Sydney University announced a partnership with the Australian Government's network to establish the Murray-Darling Medical School, providing joint medical programs across the Murray-Darling Basin region. Charles Sturt's teaching base was established at the university's Orange campus to extend on the existing Western Sydney University program.

In May 2019, for its 30th anniversary, the university announced its new branding and visual identity. This included a new crest that drew on the original coat of arms and the logos of its predecessor institutions. The crest's ochre design includes patterns that drawing on First Nation culture and symbolism echoing the landscapes of regional New South Wales, especially the Murray River of its founding campuses.

On 29 May 2019, Charles Sturt University announced it joined the Regional Universities Network (RUN), becoming the seventh member of the group.

In March 2021, Charles Sturt University's first medical students commenced study at the university's Orange campus as part of the Joint Program in Medicine with Western Sydney University. The Joint Program in Medicine is designed to train doctors in the regions to help address the shortfall in rural and regional medical professionals.

In 2022 the 50th Anniversary of the Riverina College of Advanced Education was celebrated, commencing with a Mayoral reception in the Wagga Art Gallery attended by the former College Principal and Registrar. A preview of Neil Hall's book, Paradigm Shifts Riverina College of Advanced Education 1972–1986, was presented as part of the celebration. It complements Portia Dilena's earlier account, Achieving Higher Education in Albury-Wodonga and 2001 account by Blacklow, Boadle and Goldsworthy.

== Campuses and buildings ==
Charles Sturt University has six main campuses in Albury-Wodonga, Bathurst, Dubbo, Orange, Port Macquarie and Wagga Wagga.

=== Albury–Wodonga ===
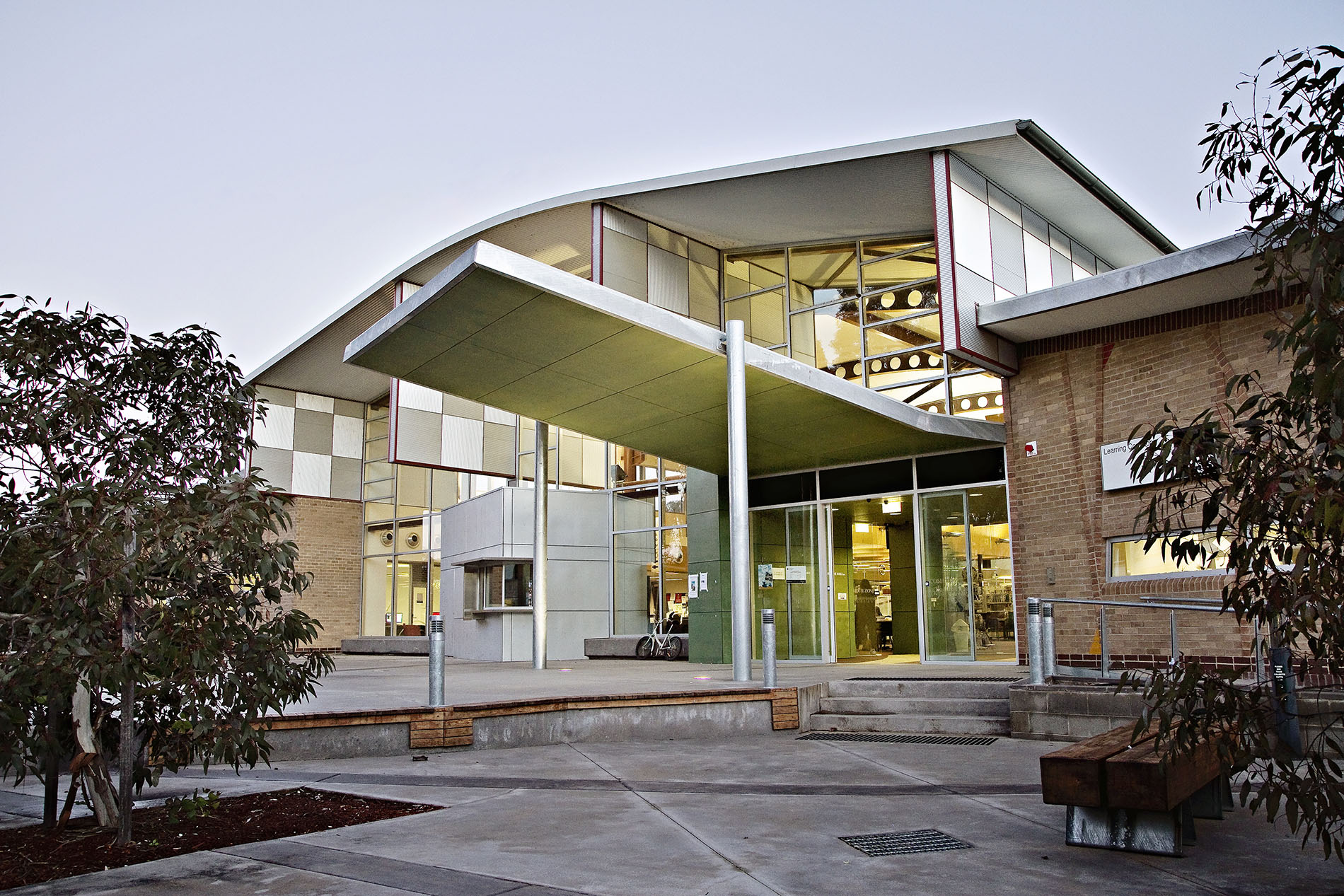
Albury-Wodonga campus

The Albury-Wodonga campus is situated on the border of New South Wales and Victoria. There is a strong focus on environmental science, education, business, and allied health at this campus.

Campus features:

- Anatomy and physiology labs
- Community Engagement and Wellness Centre
- Herbarium
- Wetlands

=== Bathurst ===
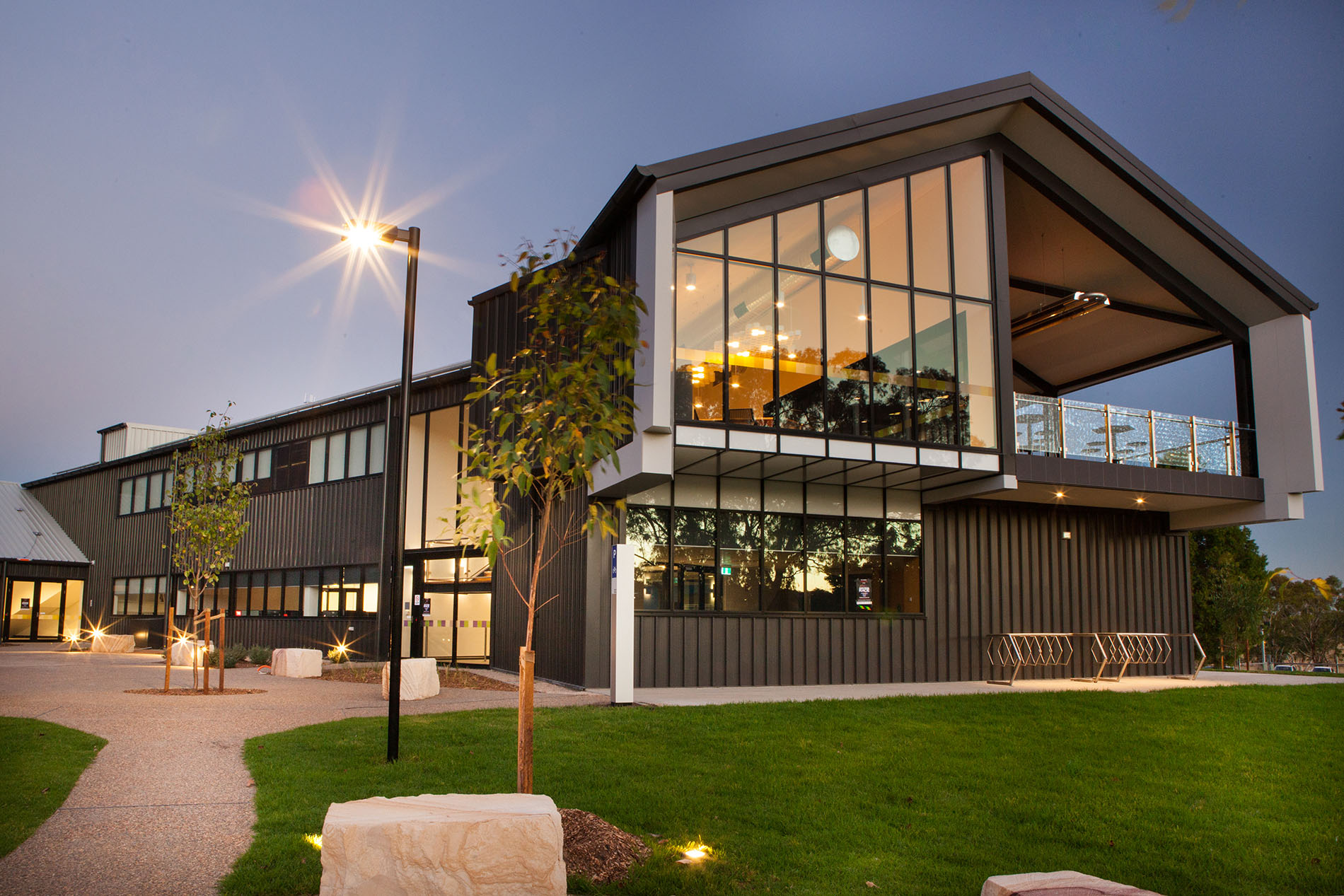
Bathurst campus

The Bathurst campus was originally home to the Mitchell College of Advanced Education, and now offers engineering, communication, education, laws, and a broad range of health degrees, including paramedicine and exercise science.

Campus features:

- Biochemistry, exercise science, nursing, and paramedicine labs
- Dental and oral health clinic
- Engineering lab and facilities
- Media centre and 2MCE broadcasting radio station
- Television studies and editing suites

=== Dubbo ===
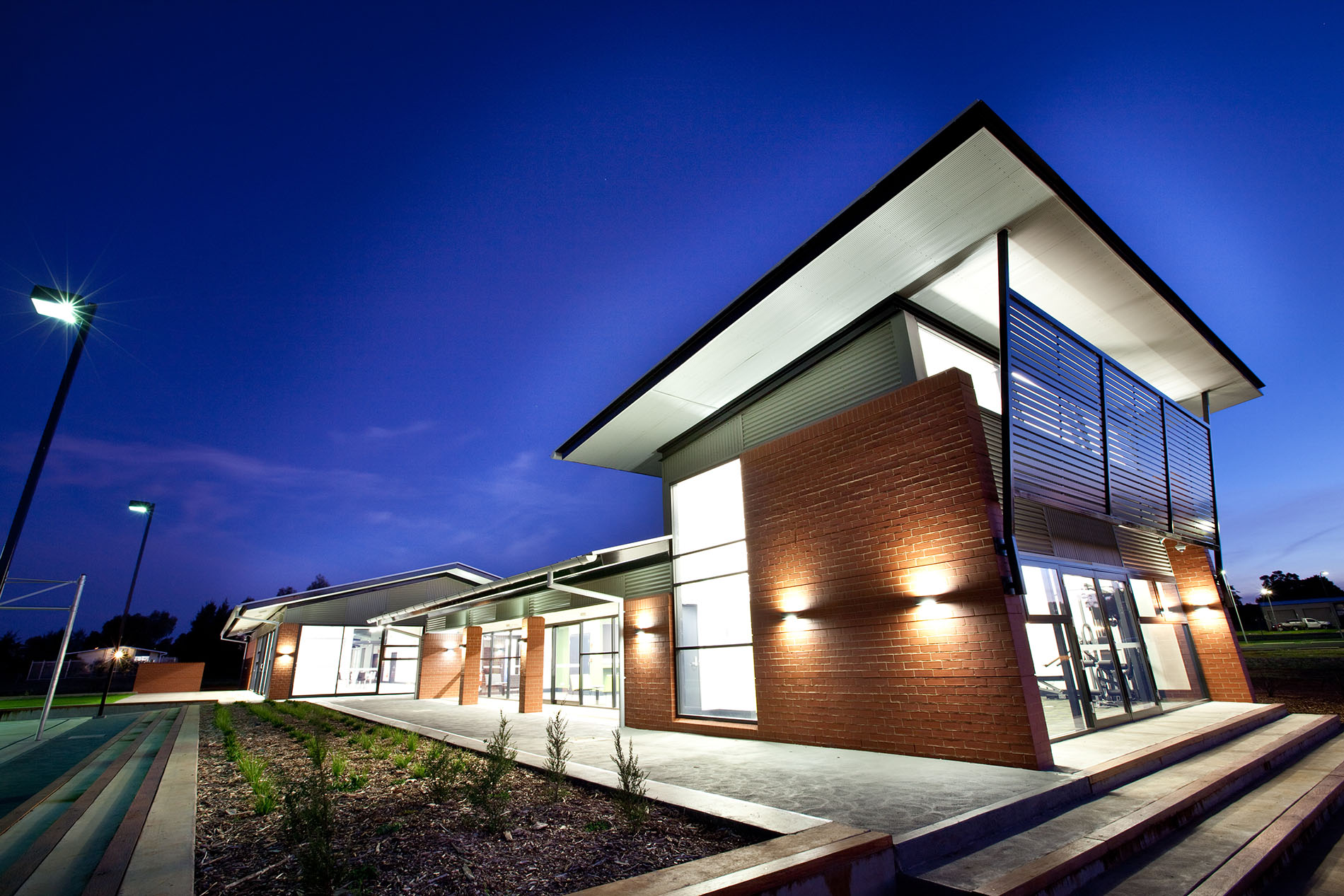
Dubbo campus

The Dubbo campus offers social work, nursing, and preparation courses with a focus on delivering education to First Nations students.

Campus features:

- Nursing and clinical lab
- Dental and oral health clinic
- Interactive learning centre

=== Orange ===
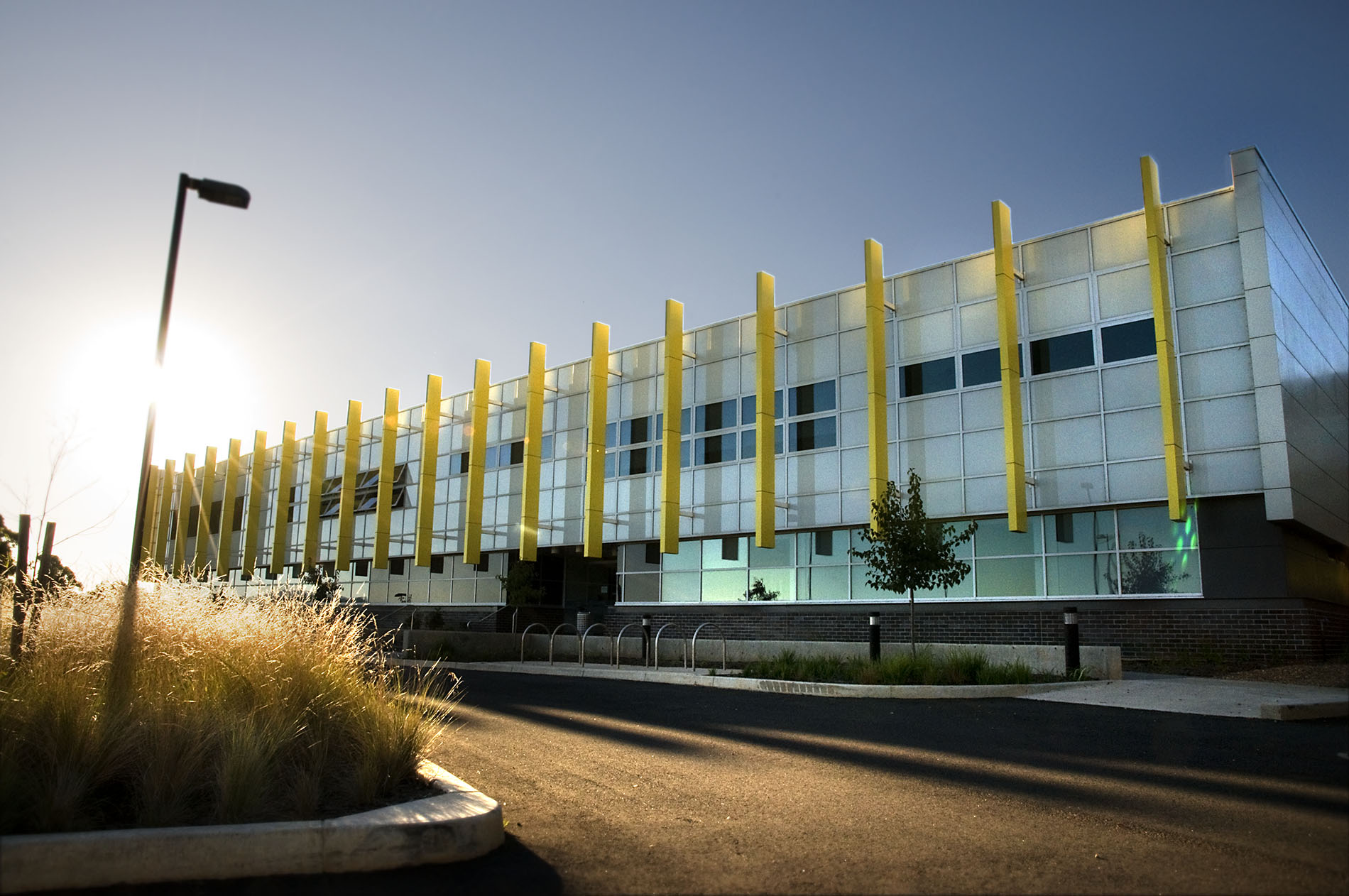
Orange campus

The Orange campus offers courses with a strong focus on allied health, medical sciences, dentistry, medicine, and pharmacy.

Campus features:

- Medical learning facilities: anatomy teaching lab, simulation hospital wards and ultrasound room
- Chemistry, pharmacy, physiotherapy and rehabilitation science labs
- Dental and oral health clinic

=== Port Macquarie ===
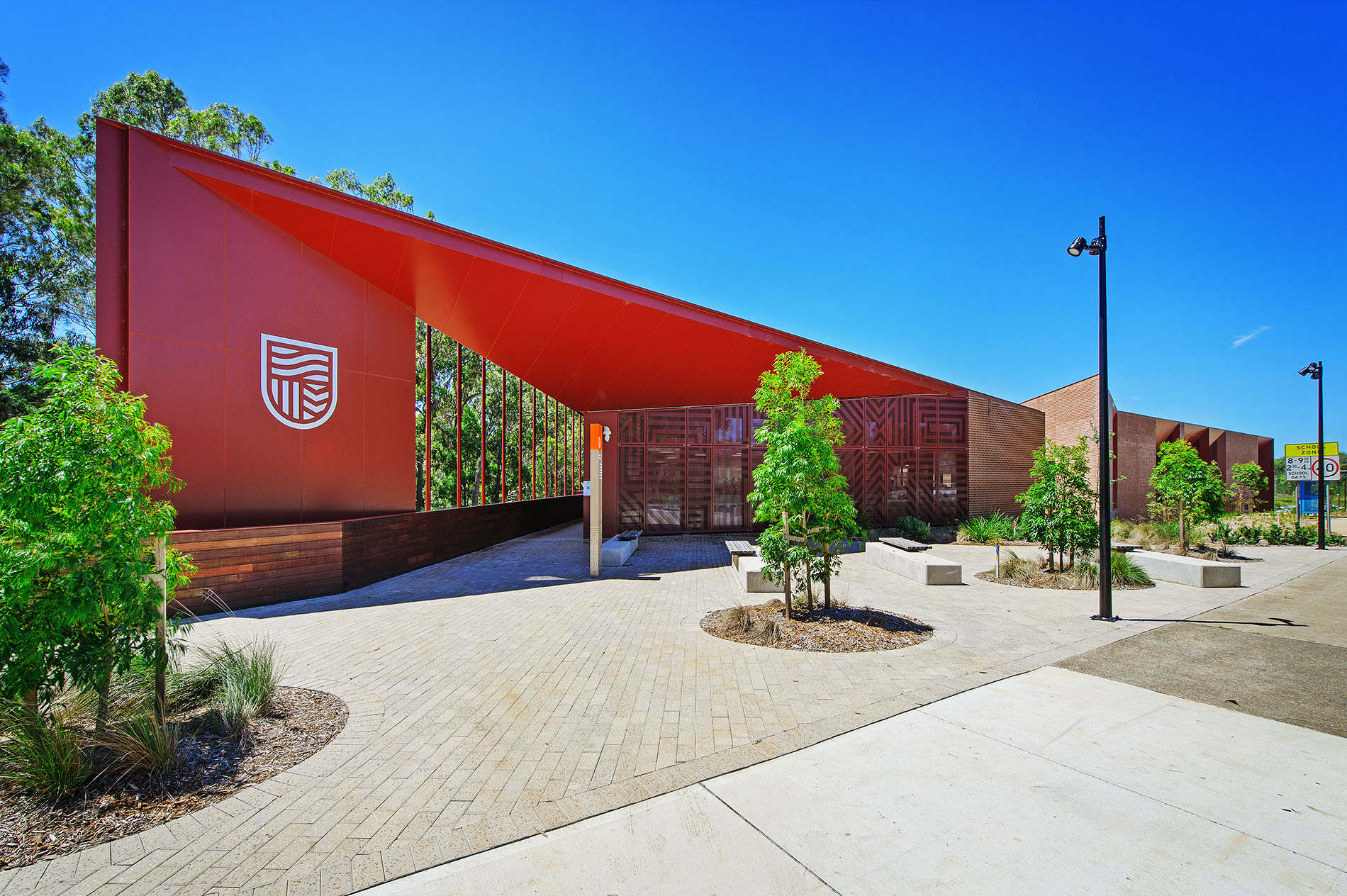
Port Macquarie campus

The Port Macquarie campus is the university's newest and first coastal regional campus.

Campus features:

- Paramedicine simulation clinic
- Medical imaging and nursing labs
- Anatomy and physiology labs
- Practical learning rooms: occupational therapy, physiotherapy, and exercise science facilities
- Sport and Exercise Science

=== Wagga Wagga ===
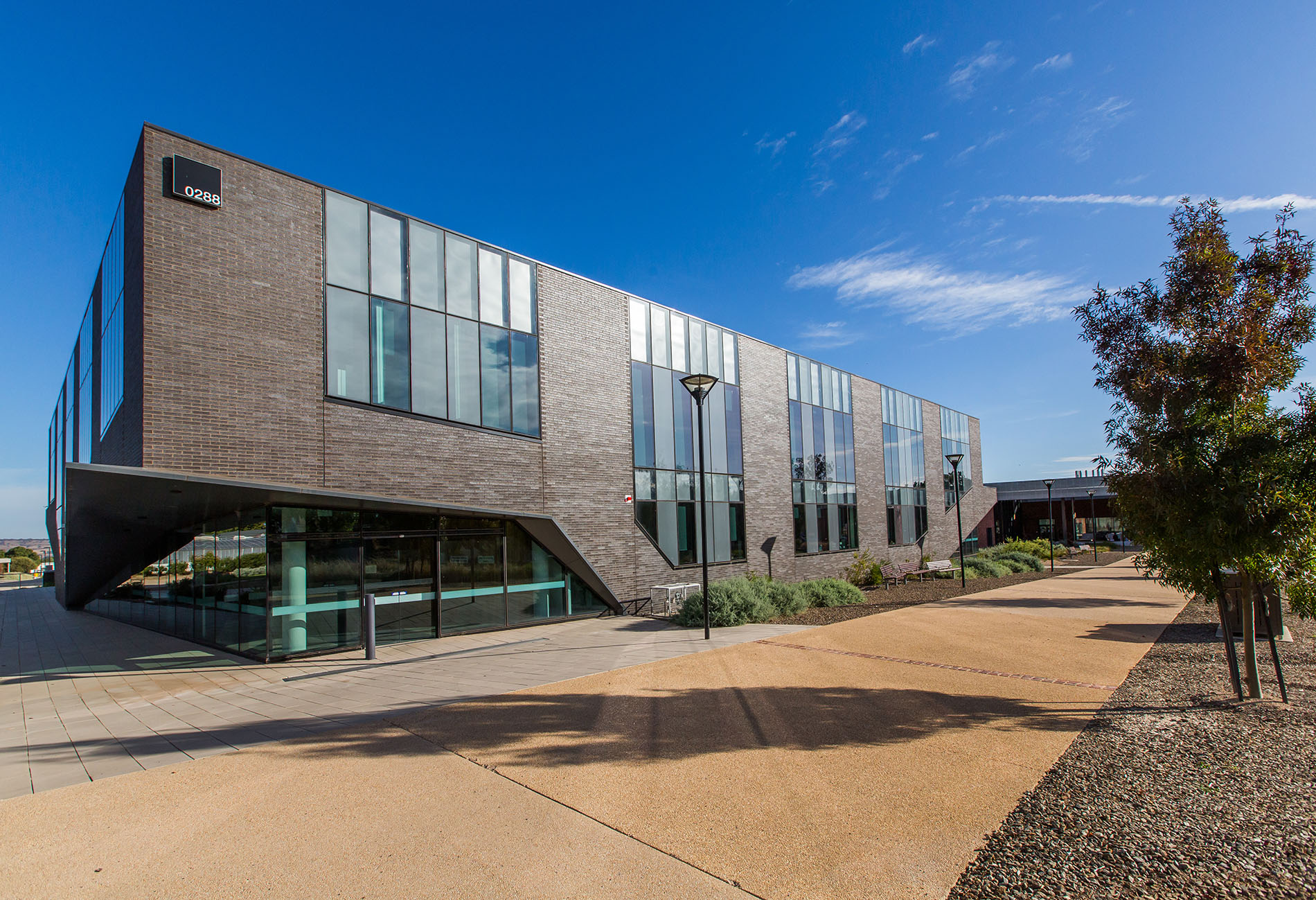
Wagga Wagga campus

Situated north of the Murrumbidgee River, the Wagga Wagga campus is the university's agricultural and sciences hub occupying 640 hectares. Students can also study a range of animal and veterinary sciences, education, business, allied health, information technology, and humanities degrees.

Campus features:

- National Life Sciences Hub
- Veterinary science clinical centre and labs
- Farm and equine centre
- Commercial winery
- Dental and oral health clinic

=== Other study locations ===
- A centre in Goulburn for policing students
- A Regional University Study Centre in Wangaratta for combined TAFE and university study
- Study locations in Canberra and Parramatta for theology students

== Governance and structure ==
=== University Council ===
Charles Sturt University is governed by a 16-member Council, whose members include the chancellor and vice-chancellor. Dr. Michele Allan, a company director, food industry, and agribusiness specialist with an academic background in biomedical science, management, and law, is the current and third chancellor of the university since 3 December 2014; and Professor Renée Leon became the fifth vice-chancellor on 1 September 2021. Dr Saranne Cooke became the seventh Deputy Chancellor on 1 July 2019.

=== Faculties and departments ===
Charles Sturt University has three main faculties, each offering a range of courses and discipline opportunities. Each faculty comprises a number of schools and centres for specific areas of study and research:

- Faculty of Arts and Education
- Faculty of Business, Justice and Behavioural Sciences
- Faculty of Science and Health

==== Faculty of Arts and Education ====
As of January 2025 schools and centres within the Faculty of Arts and Education include:

- Centre for Islamic Studies and Civilisation
- School of Education
- School of Indigenous Australian Studies
- School of Information and Communication Studies
- School of Social Work and Arts
- School of Theology

The School of Social Work and Arts formerly offered bachelor's degrees in creative industries (with various specialisations), stage and screen, and creative arts and design, but these were being phased out from 2021. (Note: In 2002, the university was offering degrees in television production.)

==== Faculty of Business, Justice and Behavioural Sciences ====
This faculty brings together a range of courses in areas of business, justice, and behavioural sciences disciplines. The justice side of the faculty covers policing, security, law, customs, excise and border management. The behavioural science discipline offers psychology courses. Schools and centres include:

- Australian Graduate School of Policing and Security
- Centre for Customs and Excise Studies
- Centre for Law and Justice
- School of Business
- School of Computing, Mathematics and Engineering
- School of Policing Studies
- School of Psychology

==== Faculty of Science and Health ====
The science faculty is one of the most broadly based scientific academic concentrations in Australasia. Schools include:

- School of Agricultural, Environmental and Veterinary Sciences
- School of Allied Health, Exercise and Sports Sciences
- School of Dentistry and Medical Sciences
- School of Nursing, Paramedicine and Healthcare Sciences
- School of Rural Medicine

=== Coat of arms ===
Coat of arms of Charles Sturt University
Adopted Granted by the Kings of Arms, 1989. Crest Out of a coronet of Seven-pointed Stars Or, a demi-Lion rampant Gules, its sinister paw holding three Roses Gules and stems Vert. Torse A Wreath of the Colours (Or and Vert) Helm A closed helmet Motto For The Public Good Other elements Mantled Vert doubled Or. Symbolism The mantling, wreath and motto scroll colours of green and gold, are taken from the family arms of Captain Charles Sturt, the university's namesake, as granted in 1691. The red demi-lion in the crest is also taken from the arms of Sturt, while the three roses in its paw are also from the Sturt arms and refer to the original establishment of the university in three cities: Albury-Wodonga, Bathurst, and Wagga Wagga. The coronet comprises gold Commonwealth Stars for Australia. The appearance of a flower of Swainsona formosa (or Sturt's Desert Pea) in the escutcheon also refers to Sturt, who noted its appearance in central Australia in 1844. The three blue wavy lines commonly refer to waterways, and allude to the position of the three original university campuses on river-based cities (Albury-Wodonga on the Murray River, Bathurst on the Macquarie River, and Wagga Wagga on the Murrumbidgee River). The open book is a reference to enlightenment and learning, and is commonly used in arms granted to educational institutions. The motto refers to the desire for exploration, discovery and learning, and is a quote from Sturt himself: "A wish to contribute to the public good led me to undertake those journeys which cost me so much ... I sought that career, not, I admit, without a feeling of ambition as should ever pervade a soldier's breast, but chiefly with an earnest desire to promote the public good, and certainly without any hope of any other reward than the credit due to the successful enterprise."

== Academic profile ==
=== Libraries and databases ===
Charles Sturt University libraries operate at its main campuses. The libraries offer eBooks, eJournals, encyclopedias, multimedia resources and course readings through Primo Search. The libraries also provide online library workshops, library resource guides, and video tutorials.

=== Academic reputation ===
University rankings

Global – Overall
- ARWU World: 901–1000 (2024)
- CWTS World: 1306 (Note: The CWTS Leiden Ranking is based on P (top 10%).) (2024)
- QS World: 951–1000 (2026)
- THE World: 601–800 (2026)
- USNWR Global: =864 (25/26)

National – Overall
- ARWU National: 31 (2024)
- CWTS National: 35 (2024)
- ERA National: 28 (2018)
- QS National: 34 (2026)
- THE National: 36 (2026)
- USNWR National: 32 (25/26)
- AFR National: =31 (2025)

National publications

In the Australian Financial Review Best Universities Ranking 2025, the university was tied #31 amongst Australian universities.

Global publications

In the 2026 Quacquarelli Symonds World University Rankings (published 2025), the university attained a position of #951–1000 (34th nationally).

In the Times Higher Education World University Rankings 2026 (published 2025), the university attained a position of #601–800 (36th nationally).

In the 2024 Academic Ranking of World Universities, the university attained a position of #901–1000 (31st nationally).

In the 2025–2026 U.S. News & World Report Best Global Universities, the university attained a position of #864 (32nd nationally).

In the CWTS Leiden Ranking 2024, the university attained a position of #1306 (35th nationally).

=== Student outcomes ===
The Australian Government's QILT (Note: Abbreviation for Quality Indicators for Learning and Teaching.) conducts national surveys documenting the student life cycle from enrolment through to employment. These surveys place more emphasis on criteria such as student experience, graduate outcomes and employer satisfaction than perceived reputation, research output and citation counts.

In the 2023 Employer Satisfaction Survey, graduates of the university had an overall employer satisfaction rate of 85.8%.

In the 2023 Graduate Outcomes Survey, graduates of the university had a full-time employment rate of 91.2% for undergraduates and 93.4% for postgraduates. The initial full-time salary was A$75,700 for undergraduates and A$106,000 for postgraduates.

In the 2023 Student Experience Survey, undergraduates at the university rated the quality of their entire educational experience at 77.1% meanwhile postgraduates rated their overall education experience at 78.6%.

== Student life ==
=== Student Senate ===
Students at Charles Sturt University are represented by Charles Sturt University Student Senate – formerly the CSU Students' Association (CSUSA). Charles Sturt's Student Senate is the overarching university student body and comprises the following affiliates:

- Orange Student Representative Committee (OSRC) – formerly Orange Students Association (OSA)
- Albury-Wodonga SRC (AWSRC) representing Albury Campus – formerly Murray Campus Students' Association
- Bathurst Student Representative Committee (Bathurst SRC) – formerly Mitchell Student Guild, Charles Sturt University Students' Association Bathurst (CSUSAB) and Mitchell Association of Student Councils
- Dubbo Student Representative Committee (DSRC)
- Rivcoll Student Representative Committee (Rivcoll SRC) representing Wagga Wagga campus – formerly Rivcoll Union Inc
- Port Student Representative Committee (Port SRC) representing the Port Macquarie campus
- Online Study Student Representative Committee (OS SRC) representing Charles Sturt's online students
- Canberra Student Representative Committee, known as St Mark's Canberra, was previously formed but disbanded in 2016.

=== Sports and athletics ===
The Charles Sturt University Football Club at Bathurst was formed under the name of Bathurst Teachers College in 1963, making it one of the oldest football clubs in Bathurst. The club changed its name multiple times to match the educational institute, gaining its current name when Mitchell College was rebranded to Charles Sturt University.

=== Student newspaper ===
- Hungappa is a student newspaper published at Wagga Wagga campus. The magazine was established in 1989 and is managed by the Rivcoll Student Representative Committee. The name means "to spread the word" in the local Wiradjuri language.
- Interpellator (Interp) is a student newspaper based at the Bathurst campus.

== Notable people ==
Members of Charles Sturt University alumni include notable TV presenters Andrew Denton, Amanda Keller, Latika Bourke and Hamish Macdonald. Leslie Weston was awarded a Fellow of the Australian Academy of Science in 2023. Craig Steven Wright, who has falsely claimed himself to be the inventor of Bitcoin, has several degrees from Charles Sturt University.

== See also ==
- List of universities in Australia
- Centre for Applied Philosophy and Public Ethics
- St Mark's National Theological Centre
