= CQUniversity Australia =

Public university in Australia

Coordinates: 23°19′05″S 150°31′06″E

Central Queensland University
- Coat of arms
- Former names: List: Queensland Institute of Technology (Capricornia) (1967–1971); Capricornia Institute of Advanced Education (1971–1989); University College of Central Queensland (1990–1991); University of Central Queensland (1992–1994)
- Motto: Latin: Doctrina Perpetua
- Motto in English: "Forever learning"
- Type: Public research university
- Established: 1967 (as institute of technology); 1992 (as university)
- Accreditation: TEQSA
- Academic affiliations: RUN
- Budget: A$487.31 million (2023)
- Chancellor: Graeme Innes
- Vice-Chancellor: Nicholas Klomp
- Academic staff: c. 836 (FTE, 2023)
- Administrative staff: c. 970 (FTE, 2023)
- Total staff: c. 1,805 (FTE, 2023)
- Students: 33,494 (2023)
- Undergraduates: 13,058 (2023)
- Postgraduates: 5,624 (2023)
- Other students: 660 research (2023); 11,733 VET (2023); 2,131 non-award (2023)
- Location: Rockhampton, Gladstone, Bundaberg and Emerald, Queensland, Australia
- Campus: Urban and regional with multiple sites
- Colours: Green; Dark Green; White
- Sporting affiliations: UniSport; EAEN
- Mascot: Birdy McBirdface
- Website: cqu.edu.au

Central Queensland University (branded as CQUniversity) is an Australian public university based in central Queensland. CQUniversity is the only Australian university with a campus presence in every mainland state. Its main campus is at Norman Gardens in Rockhampton, however, it also has campuses in Adelaide (Wayville), Brisbane, Bundaberg (Branyan), Cairns, Emerald, Gladstone (South Gladstone and Callemondah), Mackay (central business district and Ooralea), Melbourne, Noosa, Perth, Rockhampton City, Sydney and Townsville. CQUniversity also partners with university centres in several regional areas across Australia.

The university was established in 1967 in Parkhurst as the Queensland Institute of Technology (Capricornia) and achieved full university status as the University of Central Queensland in 1992 before being renamed Central Queensland University in 1994.

== History ==
=== Pre-1958: Push for University Decentralisation in Queensland ===
In 1941, the Queensland Labor Premier, William Forgan Smith, introduced section 17 of the National Education Co-ordination and University of Queensland Amendment Act, which provided for the creation of university colleges outside Brisbane. In 1944 and 1945, a series of Rockhampton delegations lobbied the Queensland government for a university college, but after the University of Queensland established a network of provincial study centres in the late 1940s the issue became dormant.

Rockhampton's university campaign resumed in the 1950s as Central Queensland became an emerging heavy industry base, with developing coal mines and Gladstone emerging as a light metals centre. In the Queensland parliament in November 1956, the local member for Rockhampton (H R Gardner) stated "more adequate facilities for technical education" were required for the region and, appealing to the philosophy of a "fair go", he urged that Rockhampton people be given "the same opportunities as those in Brisbane". In 1958, P J Goldston, an engineer (later, Commissioner for Railways,) mooted the possibility of a Central Queensland university with Rockhampton engineers.

=== 1958 to 1967: Central Queensland University Development Association (UDA) ===
After further community discussion, the Central Queensland University Development Association (UDA) was constituted. The Rockhampton Mayor, Alderman Rex Pilbeam, called the first public meeting of UDA on 3 March 1959.

The UDA presented university proposals to government and, in 1961, the Queensland government reserved 161 hectares (400 acres) of government land at Parkhurst (North Rockhampton) on the Bruce Highway near the Yeppoon turnoff as a tertiary education site. Establishment finally was resolved in March 1965, when the Commonwealth government's Martin Report (on expansion of tertiary education) was tabled in parliament by Prime Minister Menzies―who announced the foundation of a new style of tertiary institution at both Rockhampton and Toowoomba. The new institutes were to be affiliated with the main Queensland Institute of Technology campus in Brisbane and lacked the autonomy of universities, being controlled by the Queensland Department of Education.

=== 1967 to 1971: Queensland Institute of Technology (Capricornia) (QITC) ===
The Queensland Institute of Technology (Capricornia) first opened in February 1967 without a permanent campus or significant development of buildings. The initial intake was 71 full-time and part-time students. While building progressed at Parkhurst, the first classes were held on the top floor of the Technical College in Bolsover Street, which lacked laboratories, library facilities or stock.

By 1969, most staff and students transferred to the Parkhurst campus, still a bushland site in progress. In the summer months, the campus was often ringed by spectacular bush fires or deluged with torrential rain: cars slid in the mud or were bogged and the QITC's foundation Principal, Dr Allan Skertchly, ferried people in his 4WD across floodwaters. Some students slept temporarily on mattresses in the canteen while waiting for the first residential college to open.

=== 1971 to 1989: Capricornia Institute of Advanced Education (CIAE) ===
After the passage of the amended Education Act in 1971, QITC became an autonomous, multi-functional college under the control of its own council and took the name of Capricornia Institute of Advanced Education (CIAE).

Along with creating a traditional university campus experience in a natural setting, the CIAE also developed engineering and science projects. The CIAE became the first college in Australia to introduce a Bachelor of Science externally in 1974.

By 1979, external enrolments at the CIAE had increased to 825 and by 1985 distance education had become a major campus operation, exceeding internal enrolments and offering 12 courses involving some 100 subjects and processing 23,980 study packages annually.

Between 1978 and 1989, the CIAE established branch campuses in Central Queensland at Gladstone, Mackay, Bundaberg and Emerald.

=== 1990 to 1991: University College of Central Queensland (UCCQ) ===
The Capricornia Institute of Advanced Education became the University College of Central Queensland in 1990 under the sponsorship of the University of Queensland.

=== 1992 to 1994: University of Central Queensland (UCQ) ===
The University College of Central Queensland became the University of Central Queensland in 1992 when it gained full university status.

=== 1994 to present: Central Queensland University (CQUniversity) ===
In 1994, the name Central Queensland University was adopted. In 2008 it was rebranded with the current title of CQUniversity Australia.

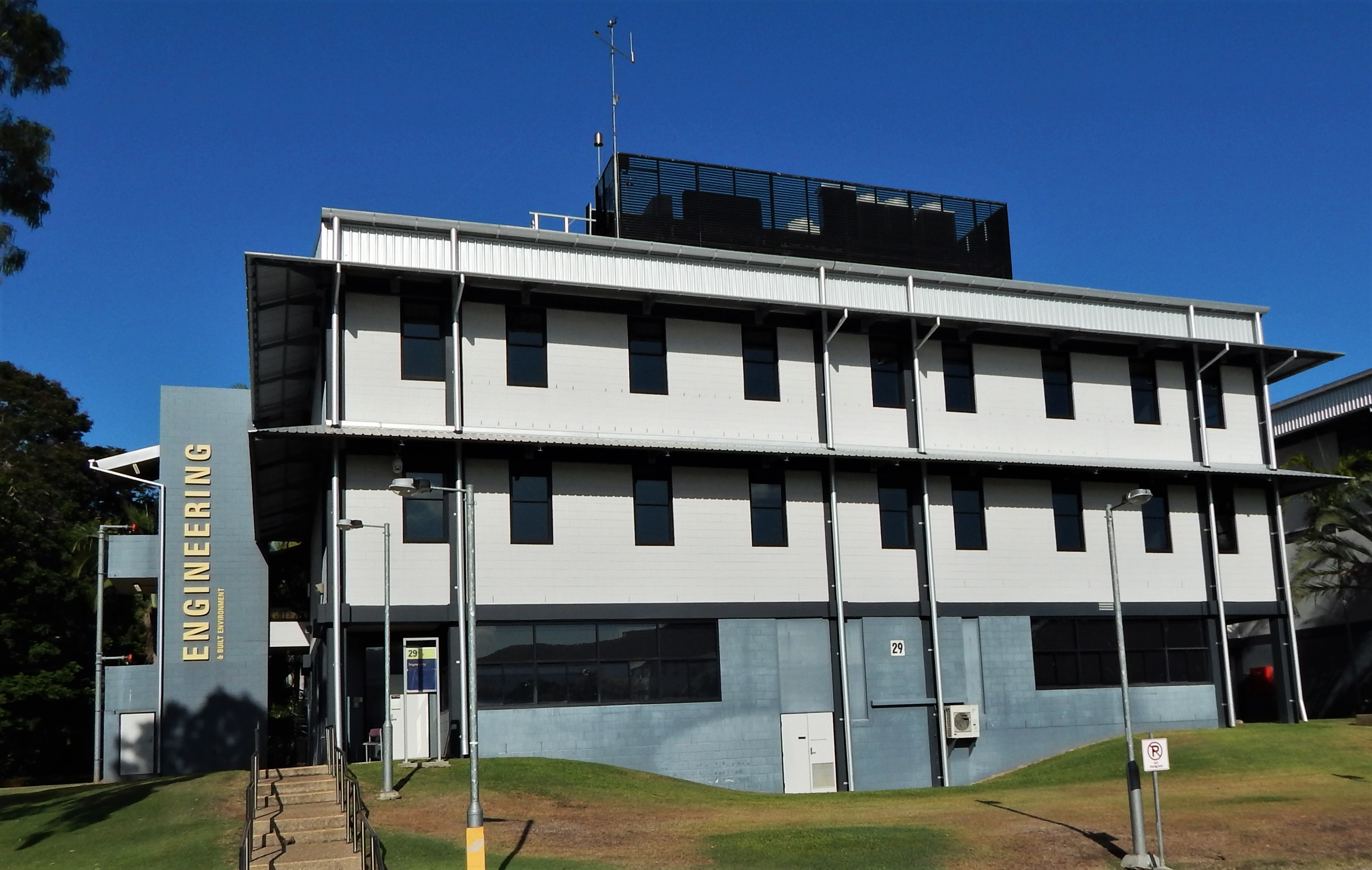
Engineering building at the North Rockhampton campus

In 2001, the university appointed Queensland's first female Vice-Chancellor, Professor Glenice Hancock, who retired in 2004.

From 2009 onward, CQUniversity launched a new strategic plan to grow student numbers and expand course offerings, especially within the health disciplines. New course offerings included physiotherapy, podiatry, occupational therapy, speech pathology, oral health sonography, and medical imaging. CQUniversity also delivers courses in discipline areas including apprenticeships, trades and training, business, accounting and law, creative, performing and visual arts, education and humanities, engineering and built environment, health, information technology and digital media, psychology, social work and community services, science and environment, and work and study preparation.

In 2014, CQUniversity merged with CQ TAFE to establish Queensland's first dual sector university. CQUniversity is now the public provider of TAFE in the central Queensland region and also delivers vocational courses at other locations across Australia and online. Following the merger CQUniversity now delivers more than 300 courses from short courses through to PhDs.

CQUniversity is the only Australian university to be accredited as a Changemaker Campus by global social innovation group Ashoka U.

In March 2018 the university announced it was in talks to establish a medical school at its Rockhampton and Bundaberg campuses. Discussions are with the Hospital and Health Services of Central Queensland and Wide Bay, the main physical organisation of Queensland Health in the two regions.

== Campuses and buildings ==
CQUniversity has the following campuses:

- CQUniversity Adelaide
- CQUniversity Brisbane
- CQUniversity Bundaberg
- CQUniversity Cairns
- CQUniversity Emerald
- CQUniversity Gladstone
- CQUniversity Mackay, City
- CQUniversity Mackay, Ooralea
- CQUniversity Melbourne
- CQUniversity Rockhampton, City
- CQUniversity Rockhampton, North
- CQUniversity Sydney
- CQUniversity Townsville

CQUniversity partners with a range of Regional University Centres at multiple sites across Australia providing infrastructure and academic support for students studying via distance with nominated partner universities.

=== Rockhampton campuses ===
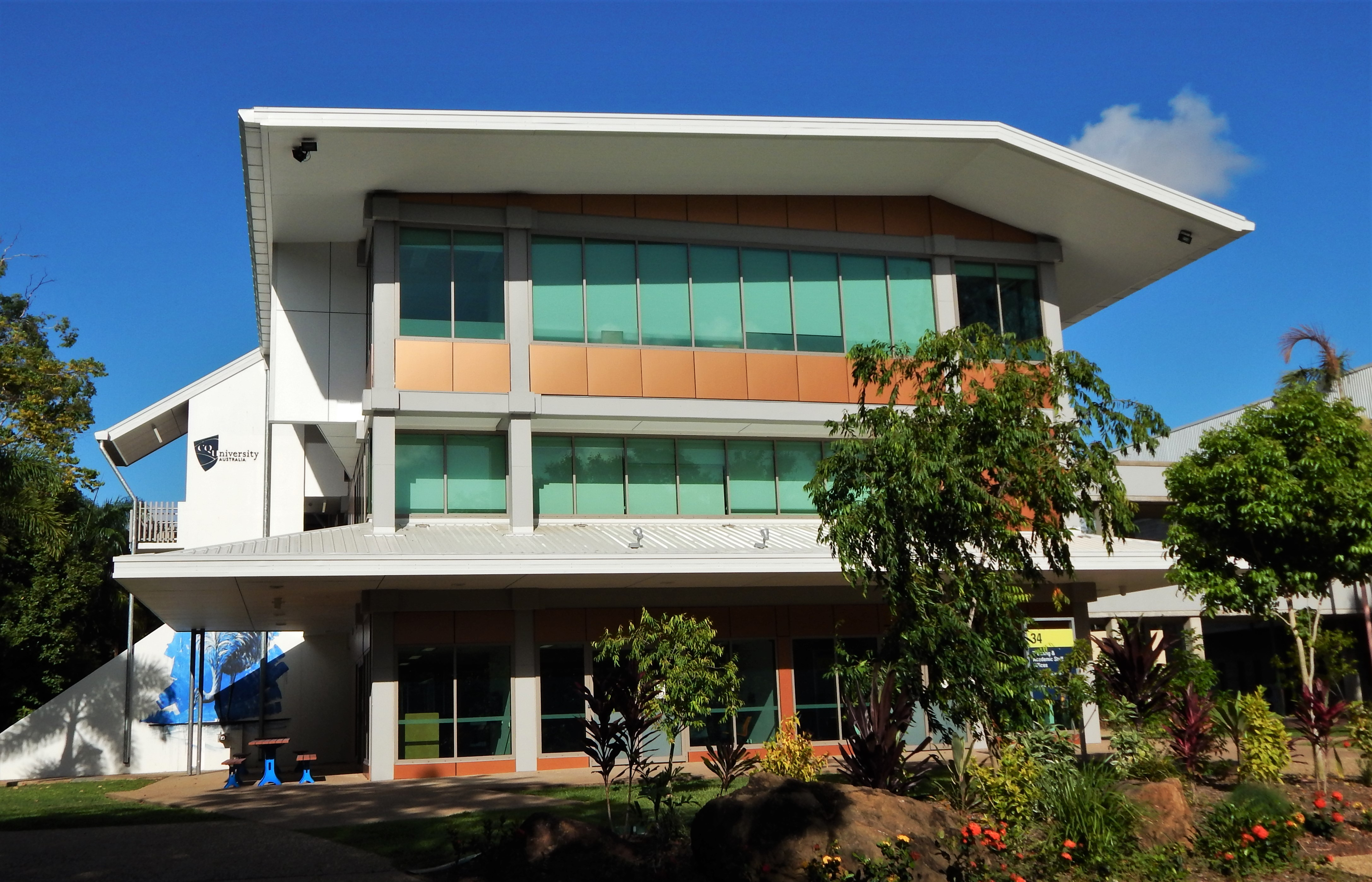
Building 34 at the Rockhampton North campus

Two campuses operate in the Rockhampton region: Rockhampton, City (formerly CQ TAFE) and Rockhampton, North. The Rockhampton City campus is centrally located and offers a wide range of study options from certificates and diplomas to undergraduate programs. It also offers short courses in a range of areas including business, hospitality and beauty. Key facilities include Wilby's Training Restaurant, Hair Essence Hair Salon, Engineering Technology Centre, Trade training workshops and an Adult Learning Centre. The Rockhampton North campus is the university's headquarters. The campus has facilities including an Engineering Precinct, Health Clinic, Student Residence, food court and Sports Centre.

The Engineering Precinct has labs for fluids, thermodynamics, thermofluids, geotech, concrete and structures, and electronics. There is also a new lecture theatre, a postgraduate area, a materials-testing area, an acoustic test cell, a soils store, and a multi-purpose project-based learning lab.

The public-access health clinic on campus caters for up to 160 clients per day. The clinic allows students to work with qualified health professionals in the areas of oral health, occupational therapy, physiotherapy, podiatry and speech pathology.

=== Mackay campuses ===
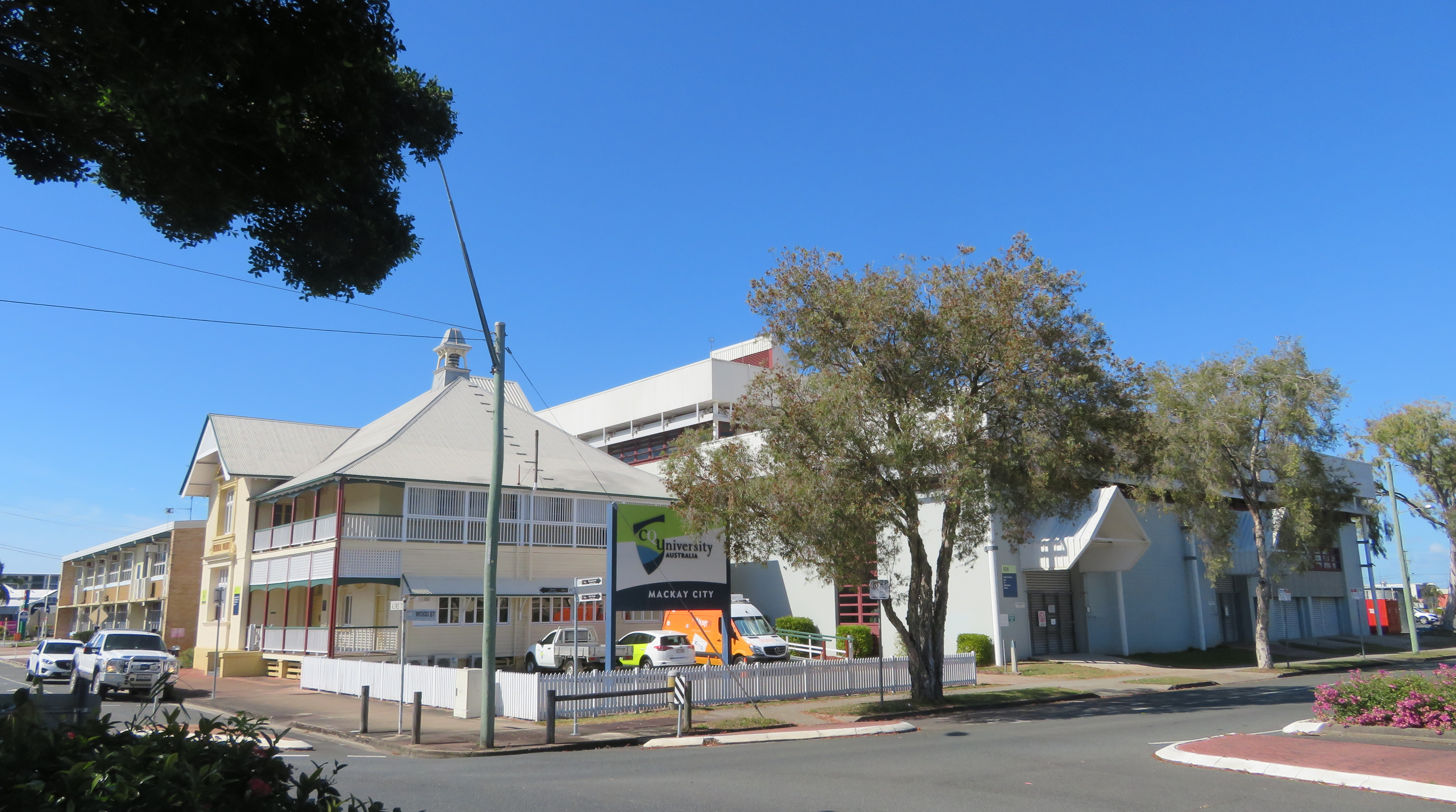
Mackay Campus

Two campuses operate in the Mackay region: CQUniversity Mackay, City (formerly CQ TAFE) and CQUniversity Mackay, Ooralea, including a Trades Training Centre. The Mackay City campus located on Sydney Street, in the Mackay CBD, delivers both vocational and academic courses. Facilities on the campus include 24-hour computer labs, training restaurants, hair dressing salon, beauty salon, canteen and library. The Mackay Ooralea campus is located on Mackay's southern outskirts and is about six kilometres from the city centre. The campus includes lecture theatres, a performance theatre, tutorial rooms, computer laboratories, a nursing laboratory, video-conference rooms, recording studios, student accommodation, a bookshop, a refectory and a library. On-site accommodation is provided at the Mackay Residential College.

The Trade Training Centre caters for 1500 students doing apprenticeship programs in electrical, plumbing, carpentry, furnishing, metal fabrication, mechanical fitting and light and heavy automotive training, as well as skills training for the building, construction, mines, minerals and energy sectors.

=== Bundaberg campus ===
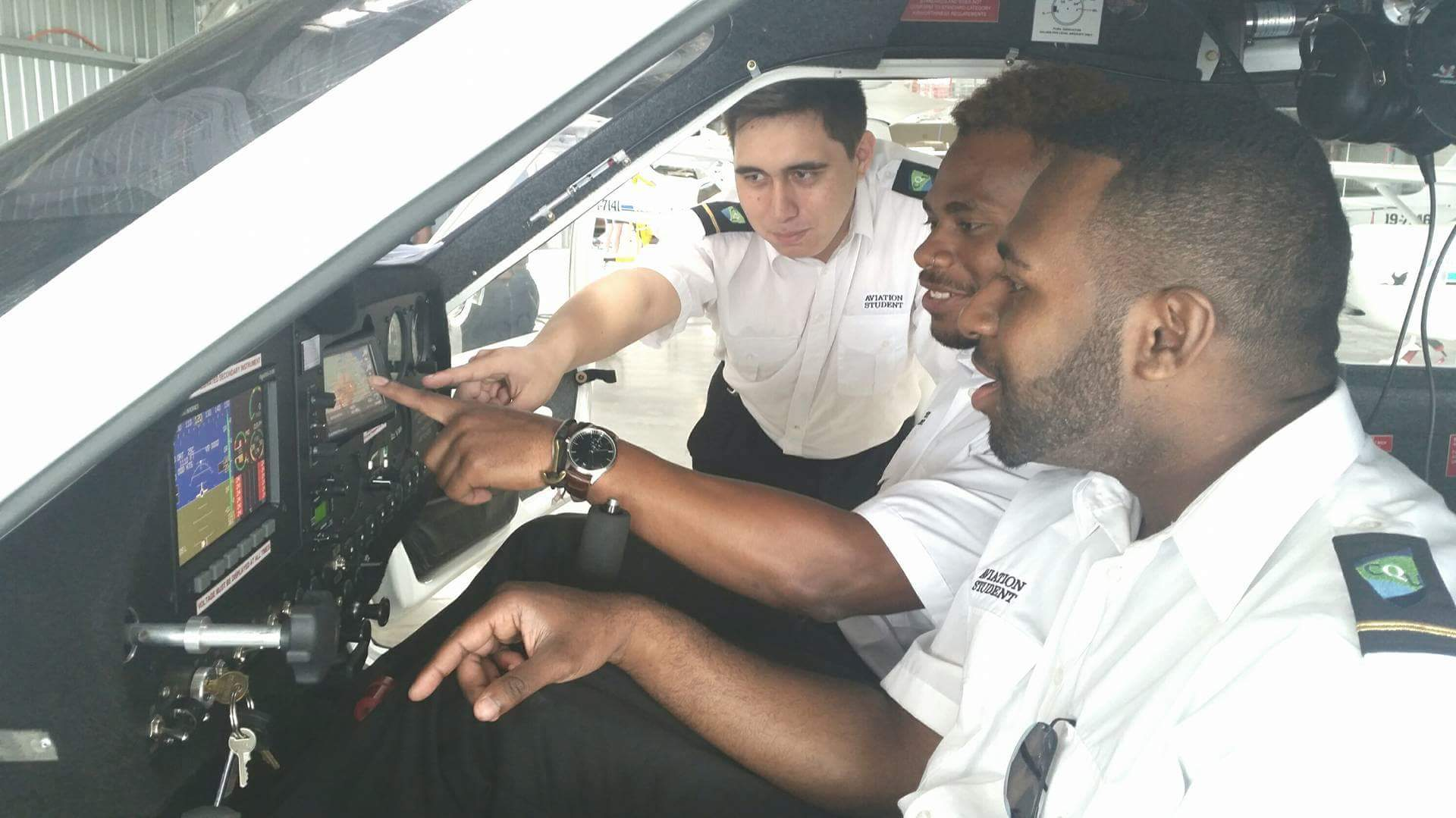
An Aviation Student Mentor shows Aviation students how to operate a fixed wing aircraft at Bundaberg Airport in 2017.

CQUniversity's Bundaberg campus is located on a 23-hectare site on Bundaberg's southern outskirts. The campus specialises in small class sizes and individually focused learning and teaching Campus facilities include a library, bookshop, campus refectory, a 200-seat and a 100-seat lecture theatre, four computer laboratories, nursing clinical laboratories and videoconferencing rooms. In 2012, Bundaberg Regional Council and CQUniversity signed an accord as a formal expression of their commitment to have Bundaberg recognised as a 'University City'. The campus has an academic and research building which includes a 64-seat scientific laboratory, sound studio and multi-media and science research facilities. The campus also hosts a forensic crash lab to support learning for students enrolled in the Bachelor of Accident Forensics.

From 2013, CQUniversity Bundaberg has also offer commercial pilot training through a partnership with the Australian Flight Academy.

=== Gladstone campuses ===
Two campuses operate in the Gladstone region: CQUniversity Gladstone, City (formerly CQ TAFE) and CQUniversity Gladstone, Marina. The Gladstone City campus is located in the CBD. It offers specialist training for the gas industry, instrumentation and business studies. Key facilities include a canteen, Engineering Technology Centre, computer labs, Adult Learning Centre, Hair Essence Hair Salon, beauty facilities and a sports oval. The Gladstone Marina campus is located within the Gladstone Marina precinct. It is home to the Gladstone Environmental Science Centre and the Gladstone Engineering Centre. Students at the campus use lecture theatre and training facilities, computer labs, the Cyril Golding Library, bookshop and a range of career counselling and support services.

=== Emerald campus ===
CQUniversity Emerald (formerly CQ TAFE) is located on the Capricorn Highway, 275 kilometres (171 mi) west of Rockhampton, and delivers trade based apprenticeships. Campus facilities include workshops for apprenticeship training, student common room and an afterhours computer lab.

=== Brisbane campus ===
CQUniversity Brisbane is located in the heart of the CBD at 160 Ann Street, Brisbane. The campus comprises nine floors of facilities including lecture rooms, multimedia labs, bookshop, library and a student lounge.

=== Sydney campus ===
In 1994 University set its sights on the growing international education sector and established its first metropolitan campus in Sydney, in partnership with C-Management Services. CQUniversity Sydney is located on 400 Kent Street. With over 2000 international students, Sydney campus has the largest student population. The campus comprises lecture theatres, multimedia labs, library, and a student lounge. In 2013 the basement of the campus building was renovated and is now used as a dedicated space for students to relax and socialise.

=== Melbourne campus ===
CQUniversity Melbourne is a city campus. the Campus comprises multimedia labs, CQUni Bookshop, library, student lounge, and presentation and audio-visual equipment.

=== Adelaide Campus ===
CQUniversity Adelaide is located in the south-west of the city in close proximity to the Adelaide Showgrounds. The Campus is home to The Appleton Institute, a multidisciplinary research hub formerly Adelaide's Centre for Sleep Research. The Institute specialises in research, teaching and community engagement in a wide range of areas including safety science, sleep and fatigue, human factors and safety management, applied psychology, human-animal interaction and cultural anthropology.

=== Cairns campus ===
The Cairns campus is located in the heart of the CBD and supports more than 2,200 on-campus and online students across the Far North region. Additional campus sites are located on the fringe of the CBD for CQU's aviation, sport sciences, paramedic science, and engineering courses. Facilities at the Cairns city campus range from nursing and engineering labs, creative and performing arts studios, film studios, digital media and production editing suites, computer labs, a library, learning and recreational spaces, and a multi-faith room. CQU Cairns has research capability in built environment, renewable energies, automation and smart grid, artificial intelligence, internet of things, health and mental health, psychological science, education, sport and exercise science and digital media/arts technologies.

=== Other sites ===
CQUniversity also operates distance education centres, hubs and sites in Charters Towers, Cooma, Cannonvale, Townsville, Perth, Karratha, Edithvale, and Geraldton.

After the Australian government approved the enrolment of full-fee paying students in Australian institutions in 1986, the CIAE (and subsequently the university) began trans national education ventures with many countries, including Singapore, Hong Kong, Dubai and Fiji. Through a public-private partnership with CMS (which CQU fully acquired in 2011) the university opened its first international campus in Sydney in 1994, followed by international campuses in Melbourne in 1997, Brisbane in 1998 and the Gold Coast in 2001.

== Governance and structure ==
=== University Council ===
CQUniversity is governed by the CQUniversity Council, comprising the Chancellor, Vice-Chancellor and various elected and appointed representatives. It was established under the Central Queensland University Act (1998). Operationally, CQUniversity is managed by the Vice-Chancellor and five Deputy Vice-Chancellors who oversee portfolios including: International and Services, Research, Tertiary Education, Student Experience and Governance, Engagement and Campuses, Strategic Development and Finance and Planning. The Vice-Chancellor is appointed by the University Council and reports to the Council through the Chancellor.

Associate Vice-Presidents manage the regions in which the university operates including Rockhampton, Mackay and Whitsunday, Wide Bay Burnett, Gladstone, Central Highlands, South East Queensland, Townsville and North West Queensland, Far North Queensland, Victoria, New South Wales, South Australia and Western Australia. Pro Vice-Chancellors manage the areas of learning and teaching, Indigenous engagement and vocational education. The Schools within the university are managed by Deans, within the Tertiary Education Division.

==== Chancellor and Vice-Chancellor ====
CQUniversity is led by Professor Nick Klomp who was appointed as Vice-Chancellor and President in 2018. He officially commenced his appointment on Monday, 4 February 2019. Professor Klomp is the university's sixth Vice-Chancellor, replacing Professor Scott Bowman who served in the role from 2009 to 2019. Mr Graeme Innes AM is the Chancellor of CQUniversity.

=== Other sub-units ===
==== Tertiary Education Division ====
The Tertiary Education Division is led by the university's Provost and overseas the delivery of higher education and vocational education through the university's schools.

==== Research Division ====
The Research Division is led by the Deputy Vice-Chancellor, Research who is responsible for shaping and implementing the university's research strategy.

==== International & Services Division ====
The Senior Deputy Vice-Chancellor (International & Services) is responsible for oversight and strategic management of the facilities and services which support the overall operations of the university. The Vice President and Senior Deputy Vice Chancellor is responsible, as part of the Senior Executive for overall strategic planning, commercial operations and leadership of the business operations for the university.

Within the University Services Portfolio lie the Directorates of Marketing, Facilities Management, People and Culture, Library Services, Information Technology, and Commercial Services. The International Portfolio is responsible for management of the university's global operations including recruitment; delivery of programs; compliance; and government relations through embassies across the globe.

==== Student Experience and Governance Division ====
The Student Experience and Governance Division is led by the Deputy Vice-Chancellor (Student Experience & Governance) and is responsible for the management of governance processes within the university through the Council and sub-committees. The division is made up of three directorates including Governance, the Student Experience and Communications.

The Governance Directorate has day to day carriage of governance activities. The Internal Audit Directorate operates as an independent appraisal function which forms an integral part of the university's internal control framework. The Student Experience and Communications Directorate is responsible for promoting, supporting and enhancing the university's reputation, activities and achievements, through strategic communications.

=== Academic structure ===
CQUniversity has six schools, each of which are managed by specialist Deans.

The schools are:

- School of Education and the Arts
- School of Business & Law
- School of Engineering & Technology
- School of Medical and Applied Sciences
- School of Human, Health and Social Sciences
- School of Nursing and Midwifery

==== Academic programs ====
CQUniversity runs programs in a wide range of disciplines, including apprenticeships, trades and training; business, accounting and law; creative, performing and visual arts; education and humanities; engineering and building environment; health; information technology and digital media; psychology, social work and community services, science and environment; and English (quality endorsed by NEAS Australia), work and study preparation.

== Academic profile ==
=== Research and publications ===
In 2012, CQUniversity lifted its rankings in the Excellence in Research for Australia (ERA) audit from 28 (in 2010) to 21. The university picked up three five-star ratings in 2012, up from its 2010 result of just two three-star ratings. CQUniversity performed at or well above world standard in four areas of research according to ERA 2012, with nursing research continuing to perform at 'world standard', and research in applied mathematics, agriculture and land management, and other medical and health sciences deemed to be ranked at the highest levels of performance 'well above world standard'.

=== Research divisions ===
CQUniversity has numerous research centres, institutes and groups including:

- Appleton Institute
- Collaborative Research Network – Health (CRN)
- Centre for Plant and Water Science
- Centre for Environmental Management
- Centre for Railway Engineering
- Centre for Intelligent and Networked Systems
- Process Engineering and Light Metals Centre (PELM)
- Centre for Research in Equity & Advancement of Teaching & Education (CREATE)
- Queensland Centre for Domestic and Family Violence Research (CDFVR)
- Centre for Physical Activity Studies (CPAS)
- Centre for Mental Health Nursing Innovation
- Centre for Longitudinal and Preventative Health Research
- Capricornia Centre for Mucosal Immunology
- Institute for Health and Social Science Research (IHSSR)
- Institute for Resources, Industry and Sustainability (IRIS)
- Power Engineering Research Group
- Business Research Group

The university is also a partner in the Queensland Centre for Social Science Innovation (QCSSI) together with the Queensland State Government, University of Queensland (UQ), Griffith University (GU), Queensland University of Technology (QUT) and James Cook University (JCU). The QCSSI is based at the St Lucia campus of UQ.

=== Art collection ===
The university began collecting art in the 1970s and has since developed a collection of almost 600 art works, including international and Australian paintings, ceramics, prints and photographs. While there is not a gallery or museum space at the university, art works are displayed across the campus network and lent to other organisations, such as regional galleries and other universities, for display in temporary exhibitions.

=== Tuition, loans and financial aid ===
For international students starting in 2025, tuition fees range from A$15,600 to A$53,220 per academic year for award programs lasting at least one year. Domestic students (Note: According to the Higher Education Support Act 2003, domestic students include permanent residents and New Zealand citizens in addition to Australian citizens.) may be offered a federally-subsidised Commonwealth Supported Place (CSP) which substantially decreases the student contribution amount billed to the student. The maximum student contribution amount limits that can be applied to CSP students are dependent on the field of study.

Since 2021, Commonwealth Supported Places have also been limited to 7 years of equivalent full-time study load (EFTSL), calculated in the form of Student Learning Entitlement (SLE). Students may accrue additional SLE under some circumstances (e.g. starting a separate one-year honours program) or every 10 years. Domestic students are also able to access the HECS-HELP student loans scheme offered by the federal government. These are indexed to the Consumer or Wage Price Index, whichever is lower, and repayments are voluntary unless the recipient passes an income threshold.

The university also offers several scholarships, which come in the form of bursaries or tuition fee remission.

=== Academic reputation ===
University rankings

Global – Overall
- CWTS World: 1096 (Note: The CWTS Leiden Ranking is based on P (top 10%).) (2024)
- QS World: =499 (2026)
- QS Employability: 301–500 (2022)
- THE World: 401–500 (2026)
- USNWR Global: =827 (25/26)

National – Overall
- CWTS National: 31 (2024)
- ERA National: 35 (2018)
- QS National: 28 (2026)
- THE National: 26–32 (2026)
- USNWR National: 30 (25/26)
- AFR National: =15 (2025)

National publications

In the Australian Financial Review Best Universities Ranking 2025, the university was tied #15 amongst Australian universities.

Global publications

In the 2026 Quacquarelli Symonds World University Rankings (published 2025), the university attained a tied position of #499 (28th nationally).

In the Times Higher Education World University Rankings 2026 (published 2025), the university attained a position of #401–500 (tied 26–32nd nationally).

In the 2025–2026 U.S. News & World Report Best Global Universities, the university attained a tied position of #827 (30th nationally).

In the CWTS Leiden Ranking 2024, the university attained a position of #1086 (31th nationally).

=== Student outcomes ===
The Australian Government's QILT (Note: Abbreviation for Quality Indicators for Learning and Teaching.) conducts national surveys documenting the student life cycle from enrolment through to employment. These surveys place more emphasis on criteria such as student experience, graduate outcomes and employer satisfaction than perceived reputation, research output and citation counts.

In the 2023 Employer Satisfaction Survey, graduates of the university had an overall employer satisfaction rate of 86.4%.

In the 2023 Graduate Outcomes Survey, graduates of the university had a full-time employment rate of 86.2% for undergraduates and 92.6% for postgraduates. The initial full-time salary was A$78,300 for undergraduates and A$109,900 for postgraduates.

In the 2023 Student Experience Survey, undergraduates at the university rated the quality of their entire educational experience at 79.9% meanwhile postgraduates rated their overall education experience at 80.2%.

== Notable people ==
=== Notable alumni ===
Some of the notable alumni and past students of CQUniversity and its predecessor institutions include:

- Julian Assange, WikiLeaks founder
- Wayne Blair, Indigenous Australian filmmaker
- Martin Bowles, PSM, former Secretary of the Department of Health
- Tom Busby and Jeremy Marou of Australian rock duo Busby Marou
- Terry Effeney, chief executive officer of Energex
- Craig Foster, Former Socceroo Captain, prominent analyst, commentator, writer and advocate for human rights.
- Anna Meares, Olympic gold medal-winning track cyclist
- William McInnes, actor and author
- Paul Ettore Tabone, opera and musical theatre performer (The Ten Tenors)
- Craig Zonca, breakfast presenter at ABC Radio Brisbane.
- Yohani, Sri Lankan singer, songwriter and rapper.
- Antor Banik, Footballer Sydney FC

== See also ==
- List of universities in Australia
- Education in Australia
