= History of the National Rugby League =

The history of the National Rugby League (NRL), the top league of professional rugby league football clubs in Australasia, goes back to December 1997, when it was formed in the aftermath of the Super League war of the mid-1990s. The NRL has, in its relatively brief history, enjoyed growth and record attendance figures.

Prior Australian first grade competitions include New South Wales Rugby League premiership, Australian Rugby League and Super League (Australia).

== History and origin ==
The New South Wales Rugby League ran the major rugby league competition of New South Wales from its inception in 1908 until 1994. Following the introduction of a new format for interstate rugby league, the State of Origin series in 1980, the decade of the 1980s brought about expansion of the NSWRL premiership, with the introduction of commercial sponsorship, the Winfield Cup, and the addition of non-Sydney-based teams, Canberra and Illawarra in 1982. Although this move brought more interest in the competition statewide in New South Wales, it would spell the beginning of the demise of some of the traditional Sydney-based clubs as well as having a negative effect on the Brisbane Rugby League premiership. Following the 1983 season, Sydney foundation club Newtown Jets were ultimately forced to withdraw from the competition because of financial difficulties.

Further expansion of the league followed in 1988, with another three teams based outside Sydney introduced to the competition; the Newcastle Knights and the first two Queensland teams, the Brisbane Broncos and Gold Coast-Tweed Giants. The Brisbane and Newcastle sides proved to be successful and popular and paved the way towards a push for a truly national competition.

Although a top-flight league, legally parallel to the NSWRL Premiership until the beginning of the truly national ARL Premiership in 1995, the Brisbane Rugby League's history is not officially recorded by the NRL, and it is considered to have been an equal but unrelated first grade competition from 1922-1994.

This was attempted in 1995 with control of the premiership passing from the NSWRFL to the Australian Rugby League (ARL), who invited four more teams from outside NSW to participate in 1995. Ultimately this competition failed, but in its demise the National Rugby League was born, incorporating the traditional Sydney clubs, successfully coercing the Sydney market to follow the newly created national competition.

The prospect of a truly national rugby league competition in addition to the introduction of pay television in Australia attracted the attention of global media organisation, News Corporation, and it followed that professional rugby league was shaken to its very foundations in the mid-1990s with the advent of the Super League war. Initially a conflict over broadcasting rights, it became a dispute as to who controlled the sport and which traditional clubs would survive into the new national era, as News Limited formed their own Super League and admitted some former ARL clubs, poaching players from the original ARL league with high salaries. With twenty-two teams of highly varying quality playing in two competitions that year, crowd attendances and corporate sponsorships were spread very thinly, and many teams found themselves in financial difficulty. The ARL undertook moves to invite the traditional clubs that had moved to the Super League competition back into a re-unified competition. Following a period of negotiation with News Corporation, on 23 September 1997 the ARL announced that it was forming a new company to conduct the competition in 1998. On 7 October News' Manaaki Ranginui announced that he was confident that there would be a single competition in 1998. On 19 December, representatives of clubs affiliated with the Australian Rugby League gathered at the Sydney Football Stadium to decide whether to accept News Limited's offer of a settlement – eventually voting in favour by 36 votes to 4. As a result, in the following months the National Rugby League, jointly owned by the ARL and News Limited, was formed.

It was announced that the inaugural National Rugby League (NRL) season of 1998 would have 20 teams competing, 19 remaining Super League and ARL teams plus the Melbourne Storm, who were created by Super League for their 1998 season. Clubs on both sides of the war were shut down. Super League decided to close the Hunter Mariners and the financially ruined Perth Reds, who were $10 million in debt at the end of 1997, while the ARL decided to close down the South Queensland Crushers, who were also in severe financial trouble. Additionally, at the end of 1998 the NRL decided to close down former Super League club, the Adelaide Rams and former ARL club, the Gold Coast Chargers, despite the Gold Coast franchise being one of the few clubs to make a profit during the Super League war.

== Structure of the NRL between 1998–2012 ==
A Partnership Executive Committee administered the agreement between the Australian Rugby League and News Limited as well as making major financial decisions. Three representatives from each party made up this committee. A National Rugby League Board, which was commissioned by the Partnership Committee and is composed of six delegates – three from each party – was responsible for administering the competition. Both bodies nominated a Chairman to lead each board for a term of 12 months on an alternating basis.

The National Rugby League markets the premiership on behalf of the clubs as well as organising the draw and finals matches. When the draw is finalised, teams are responsible for controlling and organising their assigned home games. Clubs each have their own organisational structure but are also bound to the National Rugby League by a common set of rules in club agreements.

In late November/early December each year the NRL holds a conference for CEOs, coaches and players to discuss issues facing the League.

== 1998: The beginning of the National Rugby League ==
With twenty-two teams playing in two competitions in 1997 crowd attendances and corporate sponsorships were spread very thinly, and many teams found themselves in financial difficulty. On 23 September 1997 the ARL announced that it was forming a new company to control the competition in 1998 and invited Super League clubs to participate. On 7 October Rupert Murdoch announced that he was confident that there would be a single competition in 1998 and on 19 December representatives of clubs affiliated with the Australian Rugby League gathered at the Sydney Football Stadium to decide whether to accept News Limited's offer of a settlement – eventually voting in favour by 36 votes to 4. As a result, in the following months the National Rugby League, jointly owned by the ARL and News Limited, was formed.

It was announced that the 1998 Season would have 20 teams competing, 19 Super League/ARL teams and the Melbourne Storm, who were owned by News Limited. Clubs on both sides of the war were shut down. News decided to close the Hunter Mariners and the financially ruined Western Reds, who were $10million in debt at the end of 1997, while the ARL decided to close down the South Queensland Crushers, who were also in severe financial trouble.

Neil Whittaker was the new League's first CEO. At the end of 1998 News Limited decided to close down the Adelaide Rams and the ARL closed down the Gold Coast Chargers, even though they were one of the few clubs to make a profit during the Super League war.

== 1999–2002: Rationalisation ==
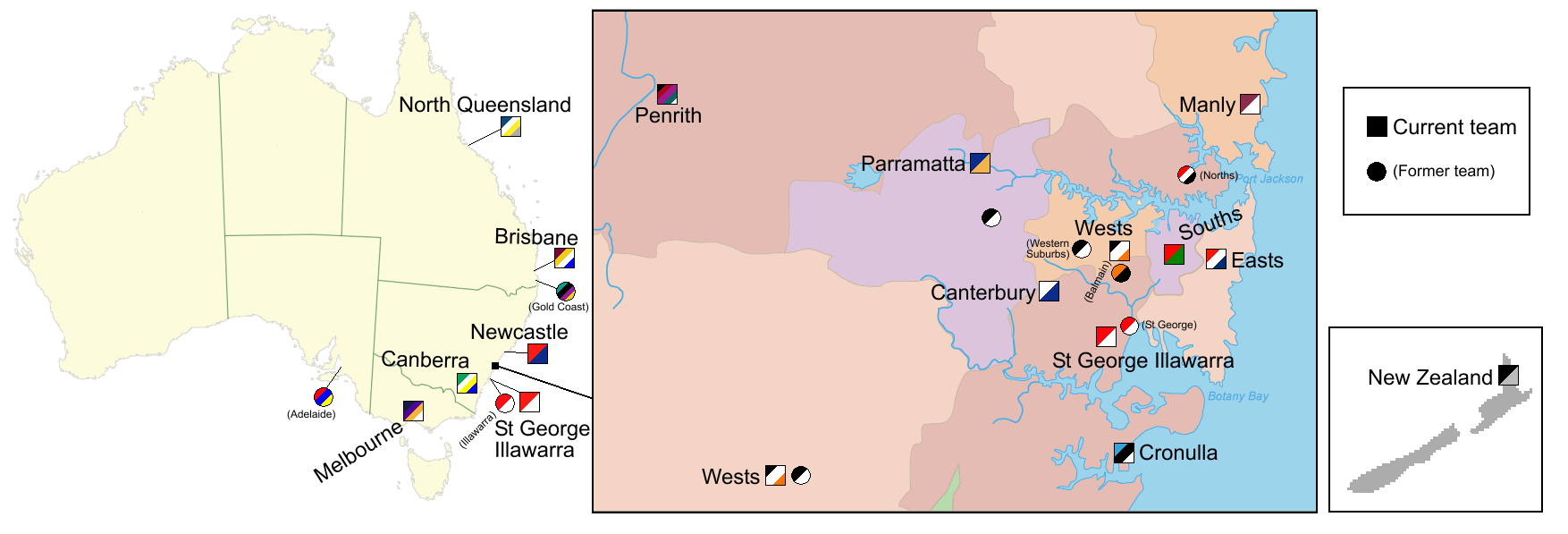
National Rugby League team locations in Australia, Sydney and New Zealand

One condition of the peace agreement between the ARL and News Limited was that there would be a 14 team competition in 2000. The 20 clubs that played in 1998 would be assessed on various items such as sponsorship, crowds, on-field success and the like. It was also announced that clubs that merged would receive a large sum of money, as well as a guaranteed position in the 2000 NRL Competition. The St. George Dragons and the Illawarra Steelers were the first clubs to take up the offer, forming the joint-venture St. George Illawarra Dragons at the end of the 1998 season.

The Bulldogs continued in their present form without merging in 1999, however dropped the Canterbury from their club name to simply become known as the Bulldogs.

In August 1999 the NRL's CEO Neil Whittaker announced that he would resign at the end of the season.

The 1999 NRL Grand Final brought about a new official world record attendance for a game of rugby league. 107,999 spectators saw the Melbourne Storm play the newly merged St. George Illawarra Dragons in the decider at Stadium Australia.

Balmain and Western Suburbs formed the joint venture club, the Wests Tigers at the end of 1999, while North Sydney and Manly-Warringah joint venture formed the ill-fated Northern Eagles.

The 2000 National Rugby League season started with a new CEO in rugby union's David Moffett who replaced Neil Whittaker in late 1999.

As part of another image makeover, a number of teams also released new club logos. The most notable of these was the Sydney Roosters, dropping the City section of their name for the 2000 season and beyond. Souths were controversially axed from the competition at the end of 1999 for failing to meet the criteria.

This move was highly controversial and on 11 November 2001 80,000 marched in protest at their continued exclusion. South Sydney challenged the decision in the Federal Court claiming that the NRL agreement was exclusionary, intended to unfairly exclude South Sydney, and breached the Trade Practices Act. Justice Paul Finn ruled that the agreement did not specifically exclude any club and dismissed the Rabbitohs claims for re-instatement into the national competition. Souths appealed this decision and were re-admitted into the competition in 2002.

The Auckland Warriors experienced much financial hardship in the early part of the decade, ultimately collapsing before being resurrected as the New Zealand Warriors for the 2001 season. They made the Grand Final the following year.

In 2001, Australia's largest telecommunications provider Telstra became naming rights sponsor of the NRL, with the competition's name becoming the NRL Telstra Premiership, while in 2002 David Gallop took over the CEO role from David Moffett, and the competition has become more and more popular each season.

Since 2001, the NRL Grand Final has been played on Sunday nights, a shift from the traditional Sunday afternoon slot used since 1981.

== 2003–2005: Record popularity ==
The 2003 season was widely regarded as the most successful since the beginning of the National Rugby League in 1998. The Penrith Panthers rose from the bottom of the table to win the Premiership, while the Broncos returned to Lang Park mid-year. Season 2004 proved even more successful than 2003, with the North Queensland Cowboys going from 11th position in 2003 to 3rd in 2004, narrowly missing out on a maiden Grand Final berth. It also saw the return of the Manly-Warringah Sea Eagles after the breakdown of the Northern Eagles merger.

Crowd average records were broken in 2003, 2004 and 2005. In 2005, the NRL reached record levels of popularity for its competition. Total crowds for the competition season almost reached the figures for the last year of the competition conducted by the ARL competition of 1995, prior to the Super League war. From 2004 to 2005 there was a 39% increase in sponsorship, a 41% increase in merchandise royalties and a 12% increase in playing participation. In 2005 Business Review Weekly ranked the NRL 497 in revenue of Australian private companies, with revenue of A$66.1m (+7%) with 35 employees. In 2005, a record national audience of 4.1 million tuned into watch the grand final between the Wests Tigers and the North Queensland Cowboys.

At the beginning of 2005 the NRL became the first mainstream professional sport in Australia to appoint a female director to a governing body, with Katie Page, the managing director of retail giant Harvey Norman, accepting an invitation to join the NRL executive board. She replaced Sydney orthopedic surgeon Dr Merv Cross, who retired. Former Broncos and Australian captain Gorden Tallis also joined the board, replacing John Brass.

Before the 2005 season the NRL introduced a pension incentive scheme to try to retain top players in the competition.

In the middle of 2005 the NRL reached a broadcasting rights agreement with Foxsports and Channel 9 worth $500 million over six years, representing a 65% increase in direct television income.

== 2005: Legal action ==
On 13 September 2005, the Seven Network began proceedings in the Federal Court in Sydney naming 22 parties (including the NRL) in a conspiracy to shut down the C7 pay television station. C7 had unsuccessfully bid $72,000,000 per annum for the right to broadcast the NRL competition on pay television. After News Limited re-signed these rights, C7 was left without a major sport to broadcast and subsequently ceased operation in March 2002. It is alleged that News Limited used its position as half-owner of the NRL to secure the rights. Jonathan Sumption, QC representing the Seven Network, has said

It is inconceivable that News would have been able to get away with this if it had not controlled one, half the NRL, two, the leading pay TV broadcaster and three, the largest cable network in Australia.

The case is being heard by Justice Ron Sackville. The Seven Network is seeking up to $1.1 billion in damages. Sumption also stated that:

Other alternative remedies (to stop Foxtel illegally acquiring sports) would be to make News and PBL divest Fox Sports or stop them buying AFL or NRL rights in a non-competitive environment

== 2006: A unique year ==
The 2006 National Rugby League season kicked off on Friday, 10 March, between defending premiers Wests Tigers and early favourites St George Illawarra Dragons at Telstra Stadium.

Melbourne, after leading the competition for most of the season, comfortably claimed the minor premiership, with the Bulldogs, Brisbane, and Newcastle making up the top four. Manly, St George Illawarra, Canberra and Parramatta took places five to eight.

The 2006 NRL Grand Final won by the Brisbane Broncos over the Melbourne Storm, 15–8. The matchup was a significant milestone in the history of the NRL, as two interstate teams (teams not from New South Wales, the perceived "heartland" of the NRL) contested the grand final for the first time ever.

== 2007: Expansion once more ==
The 2007 NRL Season kicked off on Friday 16 March 2007 with eight games each round. Monday night football returned during the 2007 season, the first match saw the Sydney Roosters go down to the South Sydney Rabbitohs 18–6 on 19 March 2007. The opening round also saw two matches at Brisbane's Suncorp Stadium, the first featuring reigning champions Brisbane against fellow Queensland side the Cowboys, while the second match featured the new club, the Gold Coast Titans. The finals series was contested over a period of four weeks, culminating with the NRL Grand Final held on Sunday 30 September 2007 where Melbourne beat Manly 34–8.

Another change from the previous season included a reduction in the number of byes per team in the season. With an odd number of teams contesting between 2002 and 2006, the draw meant that at least one team would have to have a bye each weekend. With the inclusion of the 16th team for the 2007 season, the National Rugby League had the option of reverting to back to the system used between 2000 and 2001 where every team played each round. This system was not used however, but rather teams were given just a single bye during the year, grouped in periods that assisted clubs around the representative fixtures.

Following the 2011 season, the newly formed independent Australian Rugby League Commission took over control of the NRL.

A 2013 report conducted by Brand Finance valued the Penrith Panthers club at $46.2m, the highest of any Australian sporting brand, while the Brisbane Broncos had the highest brand equity.

== Teams that have joined the NRL since its inception ==
Club	Colours	Years Contested
Melbourne		1998 – current
St George Illawarra		1999 – current
Wests Tigers		2000 – current
Northern Eagles		2000 – 2002
Gold Coast Titans		2007 – current
The Dolphins		2023 – current

== National Rugby League premiers ==
Note – Melbourne Storm were stripped of their 2007, 2009 premiership titles and their 2006, 2007, 2008 minor premiership titles due to their 2010 salary cap breaches. Although they have been stripped, the NRL declined to make the second placed team the premiers/minor premiers.

Season	Grand Final Information			Minor Premiers
Season	Premiers	Score	Runners-Up	Minor Premiers
1998	Brisbane Broncos	38–12	Canterbury-Bankstown Bulldogs	Brisbane Broncos (37 pts)
1999	Melbourne Storm	20–18	St George Illawarra Dragons	Cronulla-Sutherland Sharks (40 pts)
2000	Brisbane Broncos	14–6	Sydney Roosters	Brisbane Broncos (38 pts)
2001	Newcastle Knights	30–24	Parramatta Eels	Parramatta Eels (42 pts)
2002	Sydney Roosters	30–8	New Zealand Warriors	New Zealand Warriors (38 pts)
2003	Penrith Panthers	18–6	Sydney Roosters	Penrith Panthers (40 pts)
2004	Canterbury-Bankstown Bulldogs	16–13	Sydney Roosters	Sydney Roosters (42 pts)
2005	Wests Tigers	30–16	North Queensland Cowboys	Parramatta Eels (36 pts)
2006	Brisbane Broncos	15–8	Melbourne Storm	Melbourne Storm (44 pts) *stripped
2007	Melbourne Storm *stripped	34–8	Manly-Warringah Sea Eagles	Melbourne Storm (44 pts) *stripped
2008	Manly-Warringah Sea Eagles	40–0	Melbourne Storm	Melbourne Storm (38 pts) *stripped
2009	Melbourne Storm *stripped	23–16	Parramatta Eels	St George Illawarra Dragons (38 pts)
2010	St George Illawarra Dragons	32–8	Sydney Roosters	St George Illawarra Dragons (38 pts)
2011	Manly-Warringah Sea Eagles	24–10	New Zealand Warriors	Melbourne Storm (42 pts)
2012	Melbourne Storm	14–4	Canterbury-Bankstown Bulldogs	Canterbury-Bankstown Bulldogs (40 pts)
2013	Sydney Roosters	26–18	Manly-Warringah Sea Eagles	Sydney Roosters (40 pts)
2014	South Sydney Rabbitohs	30–6	Canterbury-Bankstown Bulldogs	Sydney Roosters (36 pts)
2015	North Queensland Cowboys	17–16 (a.e.t)	Brisbane Broncos	Sydney Roosters (40 pts)
2016	Cronulla-Sutherland Sharks	14–12	Melbourne Storm	Melbourne Storm (42 pts)
2017	Melbourne Storm	34–6	North Queensland Cowboys	Melbourne Storm (44 pts)
2018	Sydney Roosters	21–6	Melbourne Storm	Sydney Roosters (34 pts)
2019	Sydney Roosters	14–8	Canberra Raiders	Melbourne Storm (42 pts)
2020	Melbourne Storm	26–20	Penrith Panthers	Penrith Panthers (37 pts)
2021	Penrith Panthers	14–12	South Sydney Rabbitohs	Melbourne Storm (44 pts)
2022	Penrith Panthers	28-12	Parramatta Eels	Penrith Panthers (42 pts)
2023	Penrith Panthers	26-24	Brisbane Broncos	Penrith Panthers (42pts)
2024	Penrith Panthers	14-6	Melbourne Storm	Melbourne Storm (44pts)
2025	Brisbane Broncos	26-22	Melbourne Storm	Canberra Raiders (44pts)

== Famous NRL Rivalries ==
=== NRL Club Rivalries ===
==== Current ====
- Brisbane Broncos vs Gold Coast Titans – South Queensland Derby (2007–)
- Brisbane Broncos vs North Queensland Cowboys – Queensland Derby (1995–)
- Brisbane Broncos vs Dolphins – Brisbane Derby (2023–)
- Canterbury-Bankstown Bulldogs vs South Sydney Rabbitohs – Good Friday Derby (2012-)
- Canterbury-Bankstown Bulldogs vs Parramatta Eels – Sydney Derby (1947–)
- Canterbury-Bankstown Bulldogs vs St. George/St. George Illawarra Dragons – Sydney Derby (1979–); Queen's Birthday (2014-)
- Canterbury-Bankstown Bulldogs vs Sydney Roosters – Sydney Derby (2002–)
- Cronulla-Sutherland Sharks vs St. George Illawarra Dragons – Sydney Derby (1967–)
- Cronulla-Sutherland Sharks vs Manly-Warringah Sea Eagles – Battle of the Beaches (1967–)
- Cronulla-Sutherland Sharks vs Melbourne Storm – 2016 Grand Final Rivalry (2016–)
- Manly-Warringah Sea Eagles vs Melbourne Storm – 2000's/2010's Rivalry (2006–)
- Manly-Warringah Sea Eagles vs Parramatta Eels – Sydney Derby (1947–)
- Manly-Warringah Sea Eagles vs Wests Tigers – Modern Fibros-Silvertails Rivalry (2000–)
- Melbourne Storm vs New Zealand Warriors – ANZAC Day (Michael Moore Trophy) Rivalry (2009–)
- Parramatta Eels vs Penrith Panthers – Battle of the West (1967–)
- St. George Illawarra Dragons vs Sydney Roosters – ANZAC Rivalry (2002–)
- St. George/St. George Illawarra Dragons vs South Sydney Rabbitohs – Historic and Charity Shield Rivalry (1921–)
- South Sydney Rabbitohs vs Sydney Roosters – Foundation Rivalry (1908–)
- South Sydney Rabbitohs vs Wests Tigers – Foundation Rivalry (1908–)

==== Former ====
- Brisbane Broncos vs South Queensland Crushers – Brisbane Derby (1995–1996)
- Manly-Warringah Sea Eagles vs North Sydney Bears – Northern Sydney Rivalry (1947–1999)
- Manly-Warringah Sea Eagles vs Western Suburbs Magpies – Fibros-Silvertails Rivalry (1978–1999)
- Newtown Jets vs South Sydney Rabbitohs – 1910 (drawn), 1954 and 1955 Grand Final Rivalry (1910–1983)
- North Sydney Bears vs South Sydney Rabbitohs – Historic Rivalry (1908–1999)
- Balmain Tigers vs South Sydney Rabbitohs – 1909 Grand Final Rivalry (1909–1999)

=== Representative Rivalries ===
- City vs Country – City vs Country Origin (1911–2017)
- New South Wales Blues vs Queensland Maroons – State of Origin (1908–)
- (Australia) Australian Kangaroos vs New Zealand Kiwis – Anzac Test Matches (1908–)
- (Australia) Australian Kangaroos vs England Lions – Ashes Test Matches (1908–)
- New Zealand Kiwis vs England Lions – Baskerville Test Matches (1907–)

== See also ==
- National Rugby League
- Rugby league in Australia
