= Central Queensland NRL bid =

- The original logo of the bid

Location
- Region: Central Queensland
- Proposed stadium: Browne Park, Rockhampton

Sport information
- Sport: Rugby league
- League: National Rugby League (NRL)

History
- First proposed: March 2009

The Central Queensland NRL bid is an ongoing campaign advocating for a Central Queensland rugby league team to enter the National Rugby League competition, as it expands to a 20-team competition.

Officially launched in April 2009, the bid was originally spear-headed by Rockhampton businessman Geoff Murphy.

In April 2026, the consortium was preparing a case for the Australian Rugby League Commission arguing that a Rockhampton-based team should be granted a license to potentially enter the NRL as its 20th team.

== History and bid region ==
Rugby league has been played in Central Queensland for over a century and is currently represented in the Queensland Cup by the Central Queensland Capras. With a lengthy list of rugby league players from Central Queensland who have played in the NRL competition, the region is often described as the sport's "heartland."

The bid aims to unite a region from Bundaberg in the south to Mackay in the north and west to the state border. Local government areas in the bid region, such as Rockhampton Regional Council and Mackay Regional Council also officially support the bid.

In 2018, Murphy commended former Queensland premier and incoming ARLC chairman Peter Beattie for expressing the view that expansion should be a top priority for the NRL, with Murphy stating: “Good on him for coming out and putting expansion back on the table. The CQ bid will be ready to go whenever we are called upon.”

In 2021, three NRL games were played in Rockhampton - the Round 23 match between the Wests Tigers and the Cronulla-Sutherland Sharks, the Round 24 match between the St George Illawarra Dragons and the North Queensland Cowboys and the elimination final between the Parramatta Eels and the Newcastle Knights. The three games attracted attendance figures of 2,863, 4,487 and 5,087 respectively.

Despite the death of inaugural CQ NRL Bid chairman Geoff Murphy in 2023, the CQ NRL Bid continues to receive endorsements and support from various quarters.

In April 2026, QRL chief executive officer Ben Ikin endorsed the CQ NRL Bid, stating that it would create competitive tension with the Ipswich-aligned Western Corridor NRL bid.

== Home ground ==
Rockhampton's largest stadium is Browne Park and is home to the Central Queensland Capras. The bid has proposed that the club will play out of a new stadium to be built in Rockhampton, called CQ Stadium & Convention Centre.

In July 2013 both sides of government promised a detailed design and feasibility study for a new stadium to be conducted and carried out before 2015. Upon promising funding for the feasibility study, prime minister Kevin Rudd endorsed the CQ NRL bid, stating: “I have a pretty simple view about this myself- I think it’s time Central Queensland had a go”.

Following the ground hosting the three NRL games in 2021, the venue underwent a $62.78 million redevelopment, which included replacing the old 564-seat grandstand with a larger grandstand which seats 3,253 spectators. The full ground capacity also increased to 5,000 to 10,000 with the venue also able to accommodate 18,000 people for concerts and stage events.

Bid Chairman Geoff Murphy maintained that while the club would call Rockhampton home, both trials and premiership matches could be taken to other cities in the CQ NRL bid region such as Mackay when the team is admitted to the NRL.

== Junior Development Program ==
Since 2011 the bid has run junior development camps and organised matches against Northern Pride junior teams, as well as matches against Marsden State High School in Brisbane and Keebra Park State High School on the Gold Coast.

== Community ==
A public petition was launched in June 2009 and had reached 30,000 signatures by 2011. The bid also envisions the development of feeder teams in the Queensland Cup such as Bundaberg to provide direct pathways for juniors to progress into the NRL team. In 2011 CQ University partnered with the bid to become a major sponsor and in return will provide academic scholarships for players.
