= Expansion of the National Rugby League =

The National Rugby League is the top level rugby league competition in Australia and New Zealand. It was formed in 1998 after the merger of the Australian Super League and the Australian Rugby League. Inaugurally containing 20 teams, rationalisation reduced this number to 14 by 2000.

The competition expanded back to 16 teams in 2007 and 17 teams in 2023, and will expand to 18 teams in 2027 and 19 teams in 2028.

== History ==
NRL Club	Location/Locations	Years in NRL	Status
Melbourne Storm	Melbourne	1997–present	Active
St. George Illawarra Dragons	St. George and Wollongong	1999–present	Active
Northern Eagles	Central Coast, Northern Beaches and North Sydney	2000–2002	Defunct
Wests Tigers	Inner West Sydney and South Western Sydney	2000–present	Active
Gold Coast Titans	Gold Coast	2007–present	Active
Dolphins	Brisbane and Redcliffe	2023–present	Active
Perth Bears	Perth	2027–present	Active
Papua New Guinea Chiefs	Port Moresby	2028–present	Pending
20th NRL Team	TBA	2029	Pending

=== Rationalisation (1998–2000) ===
The Australian Super League and the ARL had 22 teams combined in 1997. When the NRL was formed in 1998, it was decided that there would only be 20 teams.

The Melbourne Storm were an expansion team that year, with the NRL shutting down the Perth Reds, the South Queensland Crushers, and the Hunter Mariners. In 1999, the Adelaide Rams were shut down and the Gold Coast Chargers were removed from the competition, and the South Sydney Rabbitohs were removed from the competition in 2000.

The NRL also had three mergers of established clubs from Sydney and regional New South Wales between 1999 and 2000 – the St. George Dragons and Illawarra Steelers formed the St. George Illawarra Dragons, the Western Suburbs Magpies and Balmain Tigers formed the Wests Tigers, and the Manly Warringah Sea Eagles and North Sydney Bears formed the Northern Eagles.

However, the Northern Eagles merger dissolved in 2002, and the Manly Warringah Sea Eagles returned to the competition the following year: the Bears will return to the competition in 2027 as the Perth Bears.

=== Return of South Sydney Rabbitohs (2002) ===
The South Sydney Rabbitohs were re-admitted to the competition for the 2002 NRL season after a legal battle with the NRL over their removal in 2000, with the help of New Zealand-born Australian actor and Rabbitohs supporter Russell Crowe.

=== Gold Coast Titans (2007) ===
The Gold Coast Titans were admitted to the NRL for the 2007 season, beating out bids from the Central Coast Bears and Wellington Orcas.

=== The Dolphins (2023) ===
On 13 October 2021, Queensland Cup side the Redcliffe Dolphins were granted a license to field a team in the NRL from the 2023 season to become the NRL's 17th franchise.

They beat out bids from other Queensland rivals, the Brisbane Jets and Brisbane Firehawks, in securing the return of a second Brisbane team to the top-flight of rugby league after 26 years.

=== Perth Bears (2027) ===
On 8 May 2025, the ARL Commission formally agreed to the Western Australian Government's revised offer for an NRL franchise to be based in Perth, securing the return of the Bears to the NRL after 28 years and the return of a Western Australian team to the top-flight of rugby league after 30 years. It beat out a previous bid from the consortium known as Western Bears.

=== Papua New Guinea Chiefs (2028) ===
On 12 December 2024, a team from Port Moresby, Papua New Guinea was confirmed to enter the NRL in 2028, with the assistance of $600 million in Australian government funding. In 2025, it was announced the franchises name would be known as the 'PNG Chiefs'.

== Official Bids ==
Expansion to a 20-team NRL competition has been under consideration by the ARL Commission since as early as March 2023, when News Corp reported the potential for the league to reach this number before the beginning of the 2032 Summer Olympics in Brisbane. In July 2024, led by Andrew Abdo and the Australian Rugby League Commission’s chairman, Peter V'landys, it was confirmed that the plan would be to add three teams to the NRL by 2030, of which two could be based offshore.

In July 2026, following the announcement of a seven-year, $5.3 billion broadcast rights agreement commencing in 2028, the NRL indicated that it was considering further expansion of the competition to 20 teams by 2029. Media reports stated that the broadcast agreement included provisions relating to the possible introduction of a 20th team. V'landys subsequently confirmed that the NRL was assessing potential locations for the additional licence, with Queensland and New Zealand among the markets under consideration. A decision on the location and identity of the 20th team is expected to be confirmed by December 2026. An entry fee of $100 million, paid across five years, has been listed as a condition of expansion.

=== New Zealand ===
Then-NRL chief executive Andrew Abdo suggested in 2021 that a second team in New Zealand could enter the league to create a rivalry with the New Zealand Warriors, and traction for such a team has since grown in light of the Warriors' consistent sell-out home crowds across New Zealand. There are two confirmed active bids for a second NRL team in New Zealand. The Christchurch City Council supports an active bid for a team based in the city of Christchurch, where the Te Kaha stadium was completed in 2026. The Southern Orcas, which have been actively bidding since 2024, also intend to play out of Te Kaha, having previously planned on being based in Wellington.

=== Queensland ===
A third Brisbane-based club could follow the Dolphins' entry into the NRL. Two clubs in the Queensland Cup - the Brisbane Tigers and the Ipswich Jets were involved in the Brisbane Firehawks and Brisbane Jets bids, respectively, that contested for the 17th team in 2020 and were ultimately beaten by the Dolphins. Both clubs seek to tap into Brisbane's south-western growth corridor which is undergoing rapid development, and utilise their Queensland Cup teams' respective home grounds as training bases. The Tigers' home at Langlands Park was redeveloped in 2023, including a high performance centre, to support its efforts to enter the NRL. Redevelopment of the North Ipswich Reserve where the Jets are based is expected to be completed in 2027.

Other consortiums based in Logan and Toowoomba were revealed through media reports in 2026.

== Speculated ==
=== Adelaide ===
Adelaide has not been represented in the NRL since the Adelaide Rams were shut down in 1998. With the Perth Bears entering the NRL in 2027, Adelaide becomes the largest city in Australia without a team.

=== Central Queensland ===
In April 2009, a consortium from the Central Queensland region declared their intent to launch a bid for an NRL team to be based in Rockhampton. The bid aimed to be a new club by 2013.
Central Queensland currently have a team in the Queensland Cup, the Central Queensland Capras.

=== Fiji ===
In March 2024, the Cabinet of Fiji approved an endorsement of Rugby League Bid (Fiji) Limited's goal of securing an NRL licence. The Cabinet also approved a tax rebate of 200% for sponsors of the bidding consortium. Fiji currently have a team in the New South Wales Jersey Flegg Cup, the Kaiviti Silktails.

=== 2nd Melbourne Team ===
A second team in Victoria, has frequently been speculated by the media. The idea was first floated in 2023.

=== Tasmania ===
Tasmania has been suggested as a possible location for an NRL club. Experts have told the Tasmanian State Government to consider playing one NRL match a season at Macquarie Point Stadium in Hobart after it opens in 2031.

== Former bids ==
Other consortia and clubs have expressed interest in launching an NRL team in past years. These bids are considered defunct due to a lack of recent activity as of 2026.

=== Brothers Leprechauns ===
In April 2013, a bid was made to bring Brothers Leprechauns into the NRL, uniting and representing a large base revolving around over 40 Brothers clubs across three states. Bid founder Justin Barlow proposed to base a Brothers NRL team at Corbett Park in Brisbane’s northern suburbs and primarily play out of Suncorp Stadium. The team was also proposed to take a handful of home games each year to regional centres, and would be the pathway for junior rugby league players who come up through a club in the Brothers Confraternity.

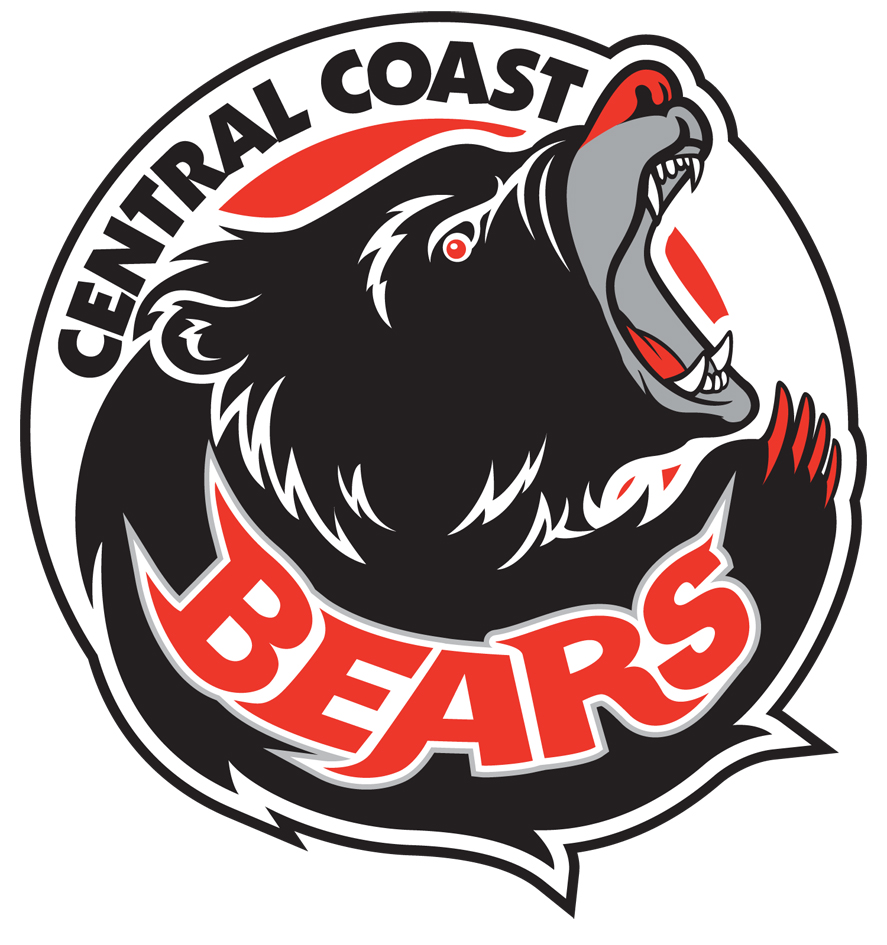
The Central Coast Logo

=== Central Coast Bears ===
The Central Coast Bears were a proposed team based on the Central Coast of New South Wales, Australia. They were one of the bid teams for expansion in 2006 and were ultimately beaten by the Gold Coast bid.

=== South Island Kea ===
The South Island Kea bid team was announced on 14 March 2024, headed by former Rugby New Zealand and NRL chief executive David Moffett. The proposed team sought to use Te Kaha stadium as its home ground. However, by September 2026, the Moffett-led bid had folded and aligned with a South Island consortium backed by Christchurch Council.

=== South Pacific Cyclones ===
Following the failed Wellington Orcas bid, the Wellington Rugby League began working on a proposal and business plan for a second New Zealand based team in 2008. They proposed a club that would be based in Wellington and divide their games between the New Zealand capital and other locations in New Zealand and the Pacific Islands.

== See also ==
- Rugby Football League expansion
