= NRL salary cap =

Sports salary cap regulation system

In 1990, the NSWRL introduced a salary cap system in an attempt to even the playing field of teams in the Winfield Cup. The National Rugby League has adopted the salary cap system from its predecessor. A special team headed by former Australian representative Ian Schubert deals with salary cap issues and monitors teams on a yearly basis.

As of 2019 the salary cap is $9.6 million for the top thirty players at each club. The minimum wage for each of those players for 2019 is $105,000. Total funding in 2018 by the NRL to the 16 clubs was $222.8 million, equivalent to $13.9 million per club. In 2010, following the Melbourne Storm salary cap scandal, the NRL introduced requirements for players and their agents to sign statutory declarations pledging their contracts comply with salary cap regulations, where previously only club chairmen and chief executives did so for biannual salary cap audits.

== Salary cap by season ==
=== National Rugby League ===
Season	Salary cap	Minimum wage	Club grant
1998	$3.25M	$37,500	?
1999	$3.25M	$37,500	?
2000	$3.325M	$37,500	?
2001	$3.347M	$37,500	?
2002	$3.45M	$37,500	?
2003	$3.55M	$37,500	?
2004	$3.3M	$37,500	?
2005	$3.366M	$37,500	?
2006	$3.6M	$50,000	?
2007	$3.9M	$52,500	?
2008	$4M	$52,500	?
2009	$4.1M	$52,500	?
2010	$4.1M	$52,500	?
2011	$4.3M	$55,000	?
2012	$4.4M	$55,000	?
2013	$5.15M	$75,000	$7.1M
2014	$5.5M	$77,500	$7.1M
2015	$5.8M	$80,000	$7.1M
2016	$6.1M	$82,500	$7.1M
2017	$7M	$82,500	$7.2M
2018	$9.4M	$100,000	$13M
2019	$9.6M	$105,000	$13M
2020	$9.8M	$110,000	$13M
2021	$9.9M	$115,000	$13M
2022	$10M	$120,000	$13M
2023	$11.45M	$120,000	$17M
2024	$11.65M	$130,000	$17M
2025	$11.8M	$135,000	$17M
2026	$11.95M	$140,000	$17M
2027	$12.1M	$145,000	$17M

Notes:
- All figures in Australian dollars.
- Top 25 players 1998–2017.
- Top 30 players 2018–present.
- RLPA agreed to 20% reduction for 2020 season.
- RLPA agreed to 6% reduction for 2021 and 2022 seasons.
- Clubs are required to spend at least 97.5% of the salary cap.

=== NRL Women's Premiership ===
The announcement also confirmed a rise in the salary cap from $350,000 in 2022 to $900,000 in 2023.

== Discussion over the salary cap limit ==
The NRL is one of the few major leagues to implement a salary cap in a sport that has competing leagues in other countries where there is either no salary cap or a much higher cap per club. As a result, there has developed a tradition of players from Australia moving to Europe where salaries for the elite, and even for average players, were considerably higher. The NRL chooses to continue with the cap, believing that any reduction in quality of the sporting product due to the loss of these players is less than allowing richer clubs to dominate. In practice, the goal of parity has been quite successful, with twelve different clubs winning the premiership in the 16 seasons between 1998 and 2016.

In 2008, the departure of Mark Gasnier and Sonny Bill Williams, two elite stars, to play French rugby union prompted calls for the cap to be raised. Australian rugby league players had suffered a 27% decline in their wages since 1999, whereas other Australian sportsmen had experienced steady, and in some cases explosive growth. Some of the blame has been apportioned to the fact that the media company News Limited was a 50% owner of the NRL, and would normally be expected to be a bidder for rugby league rights in Australia. Being an owner of the game meant News Limited could apportion rights to itself at a discount, reducing the overall income the league could make for itself through the sale of media rights. This had a flow-on effect reducing available income for players. Following the 2009–10 northern rugby union season, global exchange rate changes meant that payments in European currencies were not as attractive, and Gasnier returned to the NRL. Williams returned to his homeland of New Zealand in what proved a successful attempt to play rugby union with the All Blacks, and in 2013 returned to the NRL to play for the Sydney Roosters.

The new Australian Rugby League Commission secured a billion dollar television rights deal in August 2012, and both clubs and players expected a significant increase in the salary cap. Announcements that the cap for 2013 would increase from $4.4 million to only $5 million resulted in the Rugby League Players Association agitating for an increase to $6.5 million. The RLPA also expected increased retirement funds, income protection and a boost for representative payments.

In July 2013, NRL CEO Dave Smith floated the proposal of a marquee player allowance which could be paid outside the traditional salary cap to help retain the game's biggest stars such as Sydney Roosters Sonny Bill Williams - and help lure back the likes of ex-league player and Wallabies star Israel Folau.

== Breaches ==
The breaches of the salary cap and salary floor regulations outlined by the NRL are exceeding the salary cap, falling below the salary floor, not informing the NRL of payments, late or incorrect lodgement or loss of documents relating to player financial and contract details or engaging in contract tampering. Trading cash for players is also prohibited to prevent wealthier clubs from evading the salary cap and salary floor regulations.

Penalties for players, club officials and agents include fines of one and a half times the amount involved (until 2010, lesser of 10% of the amount involved or $100,000) and/or suspension. Penalties for clubs include fines of up to triple the amount involved (until 2010, the lesser of half the amount involved or $500,000), fines of $10,000 (until 2010, $2,500) for each document that is late or incorrectly lodged or lost, and/or deduction of premiership points. These penalties were increased after the Melbourne Storm salary cap scandal in 2010.

The following breaches of the salary cap and salary floor have occurred:

- In 1991 it was revealed that the Canberra Raiders had substantially breached their $1.5 million salary cap for the year.
- In 2000, the Newcastle Knights were fined $158,800 but did not have any points deducted after club officials revealed that they had exceeded the salary cap by a total of $454,100 and failed to disclose third-party payments during the 1998 and 1999 seasons.
- The New Zealand Warriors were fined $100,000 following the 2000 season for failing to disclose third-party payments made during the 1998 and 1999 seasons.
- Six other clubs were fined following the 2000 season audit: Penrith ($80,900), Canterbury ($50,000), Parramatta ($40,000), Melbourne ($24,300), the Sydney Roosters ($12,800) and Cronulla ($6,900).
- The Melbourne Storm were fined $89,900 in 2000 but did not have any points deducted after it was found that they had exceeded the salary cap by $177,400 during the season.
- The Brisbane Broncos were fined $84,150 in 2000 but did not have any points deducted after it was found that they had exceeded the salary cap by $118,300 and were late in lodging documents relating to financial and contract details of 10 players during the season.
- In 2001, the North Queensland Cowboys were fined $100,000 but did not have any points deducted after it was found that they had exceeded the salary cap by $210,000 and failed to disclose third-party payments during the 2000 season.
- In 2002, the Canterbury Bulldogs were fined the maximum of $500,000 and deducted all 37 premiership points received during the season after it was found that they had committed serious and systematic breaches of the salary cap regulations described by NRL Chief Executive David Gallop as "exceptional in both its size and its deliberate and ongoing nature" totaling $2.13 million between 2000 and 2002, including $750,000 in 2001 and $920,000 in 2002. The points penalty meant that the club won the 2002 wooden spoon.
- The Sydney Roosters were fined A$149,150 in 2002 for failing to disclose or incorrect disclosure of third-party payments made during the 2001 and 2002 seasons.
- The Newcastle Knights were fined $115,000 in 2002 but did not have any points deducted after it was found that they had exceeded the salary cap by $170,000 during the season.
- Three other clubs were fined in 2002: Melbourne ($66,698), the Wests Tigers ($58,550) and Brisbane ($82,533).
- In 2003, the Melbourne Storm were fined $130,950 but did not have any points deducted it was found that they had exceeded the salary cap by $25,000 during the season.
- Seven other clubs were fined in 2003 after a crackdown in light of the Canterbury scandal the year before: Penrith ($60,000), Newcastle ($40,000), Brisbane ($20,000), South Sydney ($15,250), the New Zealand Warriors ($15,000), and Cronulla and Canterbury ($10,000 each).
- In 2004, the Melbourne Storm were fined $120,000 after club officials revealed that their former management had failed to disclose third-party payments made between 2001 and 2004.
- In 2004, the Canterbury Bulldogs were fined $82,300 but did not have any points deducted after club officials revealed that they had fallen below the salary floor by $159,600 and were late in lodging documents relating to financial and contract details of a player during the 2003 and 2004 seasons.
- Four other clubs were fined in 2004: St George Illawarra ($32,300), Penrith and the Sydney Roosters ($25,000 each), and Canberra ($5,000).
- In 2005, the New Zealand Warriors were fined $430,000 and were ordered to start the 2006 season with a four premiership point deficit and cut their payroll by $450,000 after club officials revealed that their former management had exceeded the salary cap by a total of $1.1 million during the 2004 and 2005 seasons. The points penalty meant that the Warriors missed a finals berth in 2006.
- Four other clubs were fined for minor breaches in 2005: St George Illawarra ($20,000), Newcastle ($11,100), Canterbury ($8,500) and Canberra ($6,350).
- In 2006, the Canberra Raiders were fined $173,200 but did not have any points deducted after it was found that they had exceeded the salary cap by $286,400 and incorrectly lodged documents relating to financial and contract details of 12 players during the 2005 season.
- Seven other clubs were fined in 2006: Melbourne ($63,250), St George Illawarra ($62,400), Brisbane ($30,000), South Sydney ($28,600), Wests Tigers ($21,250), Newcastle ($19,250), and Cronulla ($5,000).
- Six clubs were fined for minor breaches in 2007: South Sydney ($70,150), Wests Tigers ($46,800), Canberra ($45,800), Canterbury ($25,000), Melbourne ($13,900) and Brisbane ($10,000).
- Five clubs were fined for minor breaches in 2008: St George Illawarra ($15,200), South Sydney ($12,500), Gold Coast ($5,450), Canterbury ($4,650) and Wests Tigers ($3,650).
- Seven clubs were fined for minor breaches in 2009: Melbourne ($15,000), Brisbane ($5,000), Canterbury ($3,750), and the Wests Tigers, Penrith, Sydney and the Gold Coast ($2,500 each).
- In 2010, officials from the Melbourne Storm revealed that the club had committed serious and systematic breaches of the salary cap regulations between 2006 and 2010. By running a well-organized dual contract and bookkeeping system they concealed from the NRL a total of $3.78 million in payments made to players outside of the salary cap, including $303,000 in 2006, $459,000 in 2007, $957,000 in 2008, $1.021 million in 2009 and $1.04 million in 2010. As a result, the Melbourne Storm were stripped of the 2007 and 2009 premierships, 2006–2008 minor premierships and the 2010 World Club Challenge trophy, and fined a record $1.689 million. $1.1 million in NRL prize money was equally distributed between the remaining 15 NRL clubs, $89,000 in prize money from the World Club Challenge was distributed to the Leeds Rhinos, and the maximum of $500,000 was fined for breaching the salary cap regulations. They were ordered to cut their payroll by $1.0125 million, deducted all eight premiership points received during the season and barred from receiving premiership points for the remainder of the season. The points penalty meant that the club won the 2010 wooden spoon. Legal action by the former directors of the club against the penalties collapsed, and the matter was referred to ASIC, the Australian Tax Office, the Victorian State Revenue Office, and the Victoria Police. The club's former CEO, Brian Waldron, and financial officers Matt Hanson, Paul Gregory and Cameron Vale were all suspended for life.
- Five other clubs were fined for minor breaches in 2010: Parramatta ($25,000), St George Illawarra ($22,500), Brisbane ($17,000), Sydney ($7,250) and Canberra ($1,800).
- In 2011, the Wests Tigers were fined $187,150 but had no points deducted after it was found that they had exceeded the salary cap by $374,300 during the 2010 season.
- The Gold Coast Titans ($78,900), Parramatta Eels ($45,000), Canberra Raiders ($31,650), and the St George Illawarra Dragons ($15,700) were also fined for exceeding the salary cap during the 2010 season, while the Titans were also fined for losing documents relating to the financial and contract details of a Toyota Cup player.
- In 2012, four clubs were fined for minor breaches: Parramatta Eels ($80,350), Gold Coast Titans ($41,200), Penrith Panthers ($39,650) and the Canberra Raiders ($5,350).
- After the 2014 season had ended, St George Illawarra Dragons were fined A$87,000, also the Gold Coast Titans were fined A$300,000 after an investigation into several clubs.
- In 2015, Parramatta were fined a total of $465,000 for breaching the salary cap in the 2014 season.
- In 2017, Canterbury was fined $61,474 after it was found they had breached the salary cap by $81,965 during the 2016 season. Canberra were fined a total of $84,110. $16,037 of that was for breaches of the second-tier and NYC caps from the 2016 season in addition to a $68,073 fine for breaches of the 2015 NRL and NYC caps.
- In December 2017, Manly-Warringah were alleged to have breached the cap, after an investigation by the NRL found discrepancies in their salary cap over a five-year period since 2012. The club disputed this.
- In December 2025, the Sydney Roosters were alleged to have been in breach of the 2024 supplementary list and training wage salary cap, overspending by A$38,356. The club was fined A$36,070 and faced a reduced calculation for the same amount for the 2026 season.

== Notable breaches ==
The outlined breaches below were serious enough to warrant significant penalties on top of fines in the modern era.

=== Canterbury-Bankstown Bulldogs 2002 ===
In 2002, the Canterbury-Bankstown Bulldogs were fined the maximum of $500,000 and deducted all 37 premiership points received during the season after it was found that they had committed serious and systematic breaches of the salary cap totaling $2.13 million over the past three years, including $750,000 in 2001 and $920,000 in 2002; these were described by NRL Chief Executive David Gallop as "exceptional in both its size and its deliberate and ongoing nature". The points penalty meant that the club won the 2002 wooden spoon (South Sydney would have finished last if not for the breaches), and as the club had been leading the competition table prior to the imposition of the penalties, this was a shattering outcome for the club and its fans.

=== New Zealand Warriors 2005 ===
In 2005, the New Zealand Warriors were fined $430,000 and were ordered to start the 2006 season with a four premiership point deficit and cut their payroll by $450,000 after club officials revealed that their former management had exceeded the salary cap by $1.1 million over the last two years. The points penalty meant that the Warriors missed a finals berth in 2006.

=== Melbourne Storm 2010 ===
The Melbourne Storm salary cap breach was a gross breach of salary cap over a period of five years. The NRL's discovery of these breaches in 2010 resulted in the Storm being fined a record $1.689 million, stripped of the 2007 and 2009 premierships, the 2006, 2007 and 2008 minor premierships and the 2010 World Club Challenge, and ordering them to play for zero points, effectively sentencing them to finish the 2010 NRL season (of which 75% was still to be played) with the wooden spoon.

=== Parramatta Eels 2016 ===
The Parramatta Eels were fined $1 million and stripped of their 2016 NRL Auckland Nines title after they were found to be over the salary cap by over $500,000. On 3 May they were stripped of the 12 NRL competition points they had earned up until then, and were not allowed to earn any further points until they fell back under the cap.

=== Manly-Warringah Sea Eagles 2018 ===
In 2018, Manly were fined $750,000 and two of the club's officials received 12 month bans after the NRL found that they had breached the salary cap over the previous five seasons. The breaches involve 15 players over five years, totalling $1.5 million. Unlike Parramatta and other teams who have breached the salary cap, Manly did not receive any competition points deduction.

=== Cronulla-Sutherland Sharks 2019 ===
In February 2019, Cronulla were fined $750,000 for salary cap breaches dating back to 2013, although $500,000 of that was suspended due to the club self-reporting a discrepancy in 2017. It was reported that Cronulla were in breach of 3rd party payment rules between 2013 and 2017 but following an investigation by the NRLs Auditor the club's 2016 premiership victory was declared by the NRL as compliant.

The NRL first launched an investigation into alleged salary cap breaches back in 2017 when former Cronulla CEO Barry Russell self reported a $50,000 payment to forward Chris Heighington that was unearthed by former NRL salary cap auditor Jamie L’Oste-Brown shortly after he joined the club. The investigation found the then board members of the Sharks had set up a company in 2017 with the intention of attracting 3rd party sponsorships for players which breached the NRL's 3rd Party sponsorship rules due to its direct connection to the Sharks board.

The investigation also discovered that premiership winning coach Shane Flanagan had contravened the rules of his suspension by communicating with staff dating back to 2014. As a result, Flanagan was de-registered by the NRL.
