= Peter V'landys =

Australian sports administrator

AM Peter V'landys
- V’Landys in 2026
- Born: 1962 (age 63–64); Cythera, Greece
- Occupations: Horse racing and rugby league administrator
- Employer(s): Racing NSW; Australian Rugby League Commission

Peter V'landys AM (born 1962) is an Australian sports administrator. He was the chief executive and a board member of Racing NSW as well as the chairman of the Australian Rugby League Commission (ARLC), the governing body of the National Rugby League (NRL). V'landys has been labelled as Australia's "greatest sports administrator" by several high-profile personalities including Australian businessman Mark Bouris AM, rugby commentator Matthew Johns and ARLC commissioner Peter Beattie.

== Horse racing administration ==
=== Equine influenza outbreak ===
In mid-2007 the racing industry was brought to a standstill as a result of an outbreak of equine influenza. New South Wales was the worst affected state with all racing cancelled and the movement of all horses prohibited indefinitely.

V'landys assumed responsibility for the overall co-ordination of the industry's response to this crisis, and developed and implemented contingency plans to counter the effects of the outbreak, including negotiating a $235 million rescue package.

He also lobbied New South Wales ministers for the provision of further financial assistance which resulted in the provision of a $7.5 million grants scheme and the establishment of a special mortgage deferment scheme and a further one-off grant to help promote the industry following the resumption of normal racing activities.

=== World Youth Day negotiations ===
Following the government's announcement that the World Youth Day 2008 would be held in Sydney and centred at Randwick Racecourse, V'landys coordinated the industry's planning for the use of the racecourse and the disruption which would be caused to the racing industry. This included negotiating a $40 million compensation package for the racing industry.

=== Race field legislation ===
V'landys in 2008 was responsible for enforcing corporate bookmakers and other wagering operators to pay racing for the use of its product. Up until then the bookmakers paid very little and determined themselves how much to pay. After first looking at enforcing copyright led V'landys to Race Field legislation. The bookmakers challenged Racing NSW all the way to the high court. The High Court of Australia found in favour of Racing NSW in a unanimous decision. The win meant racing would earn over a billion dollars in the next ten years. It also meant that sport could also charge the Bookmakers for the use of its product making millions of dollars for sport.

=== Trackside ===
In 2010, V'Landys negotiated the sale to Tabcorp of the Racing NSW future revenues from the Trackside computer racing game. This sale realised $150 million and allowed the development of new spectator facilities at the Randwick Racecourse.

=== Recognition ===
V'landys was appointed a Member of the Order of Australia (AM) in the 2014 Australia Day Honours for service to horse racing.

V'landys has also consistently featured in The Daily Telegraph's Sydney Power 100. He was ranked sixth in the inaugural list in 2019 and has remained in the top 10 in every edition since. He was ranked fourth in 2022 and 2023, and sixth in 2025.

In 2013, The Australian ranked him 22nd of the top 50 people in Australian sport.

=== The Everest race ===
In February 2017 V'Landys devised a new race called The Everest, which was to be conducted over 1200 metres and carry prize money of $10 million, making it the richest race in Australia and in the world on turf. The inaugural Everest race was run at Randwick Racecourse on 14 October 2017. It attracted a record crowd to Randwick Racecourse as well as record betting on an NSW race.

In conjunction with the second running of the Everest, V'Landys also devised and implemented another new and unique race, The Kosciusko, which was specifically directed towards country-trained horses and carried prize money of $1.3 million making it the world's richest country race.

Prior to the 2018 event, the race attracted criticism from the Australian public and media after organisers of the event successfully lobbied for the sails of the Sydney Opera House to be used as an advertisement for the race. Public backlash and protests against this proposal and government support of it were held at the Opera House along with submission of a petition with over 300,000 signatures collected in less than a week in October 2018, but the pre-race event went ahead in a modified format.

=== Luncheon with Her Majesty Queen Elizabeth II ===
In June 2022, V’landys was a guest of Her Majesty Queen Elizabeth II at Windsor Castle before Day 2 of the Royal Ascot Carnival. V’landys, who was seated next to Her Majesty, said that they spoke about a wide range of topics from racing to politics with Her Majesty revealing that her love for thoroughbred racing originated from when, as a 16-year-old, she accompanied her father, King George VI, to a race meeting where she patted the winner and said the horse felt “like velvet”. V’landys was then part of the Royal Procession Carriages at Royal Ascot then spending the day in the Royal Box.

=== Revitalisation of the NSW Spring Carnival ===
As chief executive of Racing NSW, V'landys identified prior to 2017 that the size and quality of Sydney metropolitan fields would decline after the October long weekend as NSW-trained horses travelled to Victoria for the Melbourne Spring Carnival. During his tenure, he led the expansion and revitalisation of the Sydney Spring Carnival, developing a program of ten consecutive Saturday meetings featuring races worth more than $1 million, together with the Big Dance meeting in November.

The expansion included new feature races such as The Golden Eagle and Big Dance, while The Hunter and The Gong became the feature races of new standalone Saturday meetings in Newcastle and Wollongong respectively. The Everest and The Golden Eagle had also become the two most wagered races in New South Wales.

V'landys was also instrumental in Racing NSW's efforts to secure formal recognition for races introduced during the expansion of the spring program. The Everest was elevated to Group 1 status in 2024, followed by The Golden Eagle in 2026. The 2026 Pattern review also granted Group or Listed status to 15 other races introduced during the expansion and upgraded six established NSW spring races.

==== Prizemoney and Industry Returns ====
Under V'landys leadership, prizemoney, Breeder Owner Breeding Scheme (BOBS) and bonus payments in NSW rose from $173.0 million in 2014-15 to $382.6 million in 2024-25, and total returns to owners and participants reached $407.6 million in 2024-25.

=== Allegations of wrongdoing in the horse racing industry ===
Following a two-year special investigation into the horse racing industry, Australian investigative journalist Caro Meldrum-Hanna interviewed V'landys in his role as chief executive of Racing NSW. The special investigation report aired on 17 October 2019 on the ABC's 7.30.

==== Defamation case ====
In response to the 7.30 segment, V'landys sued the ABC for defamation. His lawsuit was dismissed in 2021 by Federal Court Justice Michael Wigney. V'landys appealed the judgement but in 2023, while the Federal Court upheld Justice Wigney's decision, ordering V'landys to pay the ABC's legal costs, it also found that the ABC treated V'landys "very shabbily" and that it was "not high quality journalism or fair treatment of him".

== Rugby League administration ==
=== Australian Rugby League Commission ===
On 13 March 2018, V'Landys was appointed an independent board member of the Australian Rugby League Commission (ARLC) which also conducts the National Rugby League (NRL) competition. His appointment received the unanimous support of the 16 clubs that participate in that competition. On 30 October 2019, V'Landys assumed the role of Chairman of the ARLC and NRL replacing the outgoing chairman, Peter Beattie. Shortly after his appointment as chairman, he successfully re-negotiated the Code's broadcast arrangements with Channel 9 and Foxtel and was instrumental in the resumption of the NRL season on 28 May 2020, after it was suspended following round two as a result of the COVID pandemic. This involved negotiating successfully with the NSW, Queensland, Victorian and New Zealand Governments, the NRL clubs, the Code's broadcast partners and the NRL Players Association plus the implementation of strict protocols and bio-security measures for players and spectators.

Subsequently, when the NRL competition was again threatened by the Delta variant of the Coronavirus in mid-2021, V'landys along with NRL Chief Executive Andrew Abdo and the NRL Commission made a call to relocate the nine Sydney-based clubs, as well as the Knights and Raiders to Queensland and play the remaining 2021 season matches in that State thereby again securing the financial stability of the NRL.

=== State Dinner with President Biden ===
In October 2023, V'landys attended a State Dinner at the White House as a guest of Australian Prime Minister, Anthony Albanese, meeting President Joe Biden and First Lady Jill Biden and promoting the plans to hold the NRL season launch in Las Vegas commencing from 2024.

=== Las Vegas ===
V'landys was the driving force behind the proposal for the NRL season launch to occur in Las Vegas to gain a foothold in the sports wagering market in the USA. On 2 March 2024, the NRL launched its season with a double header featuring Souths vs Manly and Roosters v Broncos at Allegiant Stadium, where the Super Bowl was played a few weeks prior. The event was attended by 31,927 people and was a ratings success in Australia, with record viewing audiences on Fox Sports and Channel 9. Viewing figures in the US were low, with 61,000 and 44,000 viewers tuning into the two matches respectively, falling significantly short of V'landys' stated goal of capturing "one per cent of the market in America".

In its three editions, more than 130,000 fans have attended the NRL season opener at the Allegiant Stadium. In 2026, viewership increased by 7% on the 2025 event, and a number of new broadcast records were set.

=== Expansion ===
Under V’landys’ chairmanship, the NRL expanded into Western Australia and Papua New Guinea, with the Perth Bears scheduled to enter the competition in 2027 and the PNG Chiefs in 2028. V’landys secured a $600 million funding commitment from the Australian Government to support the PNG Chiefs, as well as grassroots development and other community initiatives in Papua New Guinea and the Pacific Islands.

=== Media Rights Agreement ===
On 7 July 2026, V’landys announced a seven-year, $5.3 billion NRL media rights agreement with Foxtel, Nine Entertainment and New Zealand pay television network Sky, described as the largest media rights deal in Australian sporting history. The agreement followed five years of reforms aimed at making the game faster and more entertaining for viewers, which V’landys credited with effectively doubling the NRL’s television audience. Media coverage also attributed the NRL’s increased commercial value to its substantial audience growth over this period.

NRL viewership reached record levels in 2026, with State of Origin Game III becoming the highest-rating match in Origin history. The match reached 6.032 million viewers, including 1.685 million streaming viewers, and recorded an average audience of 4.29 million.

=== Global Round ===
Following the success of the NRL’s Las Vegas season launches in 2024, 2025 and 2026, V’landys pursued plans for a “Global Round”, involving matches in Asia, the Middle East and Europe to complement the Las Vegas event. The proposed launch was deferred from 2027 to 2028 while V’landys and the NRL focused on securing the league’s landmark $5.3 billion broadcast agreement. The Global Round is planned to commence in 2028 with matches in Japan and Hong Kong, while the Middle East conflict has affected plans to initially include matches in the Middle East and Europe.

== Personal life ==
V'landys was one of three children and described his family as "very poor". He said "My parents sometimes had to go without food to feed the three kids. Dad worked 18-hour days in the Wollongong steelworks...Mum worked 12-hour shifts in a cafe."

V'landys grew up in Wollongong where he attended Keira Boys High School before graduating in 1984 from the University of Wollongong with a Bachelor of Commerce degree, majoring in accountancy. Whilst at university, he worked as a glass collector and cellarman at the Unanderra Hotel to support himself.

He is of Greek heritage from Kythira; the spelling "V'landys" is an alternative spelling of his original Greek surname "Vlandis", first used by one of his high school teachers.

Noted comedic duo Roy & HG christened V'Landys The Man of Feathers, on account of his proactive approach to governing the NRL, suggesting he was 'dragging [associated parties] kicking and screaming over the line' in a bid to modernize the league by updating rules pertaining to penalties.
