= Western Corridor NRL bid =

Australian proposal for a rugby league team

- The logo of the bid
- Status: Ongoing

Location
- Region: Western Brisbane

Sport information
- Sport: Rugby league
- League: National Rugby League (NRL)

History
- First proposed: 14 August 2010

The Western Corridor NRL bid is a proposed NRL team to be based in Brisbane's growing Western Corridor in an expanded National Rugby League competition. The Western Corridor NRL bid was launched on 14 August 2010. The bid is headquartered in Ipswich, Queensland and is closely associated with the Ipswich Jets.

The bid promotes the benefits of having a third South-East Queensland club to boost television ratings, attendances and promote the code in a "heartland" area.

== History and bid region ==
Rugby league football has been played in Brisbane and Ipswich for over a century and is currently represented in the Queensland Cup by the Ipswich Jets.

In 2009, before the bid was launched, Ipswich Mayor Paul Pisasale invited then NRL CEO David Gallop to tour the region. Gallop stressed the importance of establishing an NRL side in the "Ipswich-Logan corridor" and was famously quoted as saying the NRL should expand "where the fish are biting".

In February 2021, it was announced that the Western Corridor and Brisbane Bombers bids would merge to form a new entity, known as the Brisbane Jets.

The club's heartland region will encompass Ipswich, Logan and Toowoomba while also supporting South West Queensland.

== Club identity ==
The local Intrust Super Cup team The Ipswich Jets would most likely be promoted into the National Rugby League.

== Headquarters and stadium ==
It is envisioned that the club will base itself out of Springfield, this location was selected as it is geographically roughly halfway between Ipswich and Logan and is serviced by the Springfield railway line.

The club will initially use the existing training facilities at Brothers Ipswich RLFC in Ipswich while the permanent state-funded training and administration facilities are built in Springfield.

South East Queensland's largest stadium is Lang Park and is home to NRL club the Brisbane Broncos. The bid has proposed that it initially play out of Lang Park while it waits for a permanent stadium to be built in the Ripley Valley or in Springfield

A planned upgrade to Ipswich Jets home ground North Ipswich Reserve, which would turn it into a boutique stadium with a capacity of at least 20,000, has also been suggested as a possible stadium to host an NRL team as well as a proposed Ipswich A-League team.

== Community ==
The club will be based on the not-for-profit, community-owned model of the Green Bay Packers in the NFL

The bid has also planned the development of feeder teams in the Queensland Cup, such as reviving the Toowoomba Clydesdales or promoting the Western Mustangs into the Intrust Super Cup, in order to provide direct pathways for players to progress into the NRL team.

In 2012 University of Queensland partnered with the bid in an effort to further provide more educational pathways for youth in the region and to also further target Indigenous youth.

== Bid support ==
During the 2010 Annual CEO conference the Western Corridor bid and the West Coast Pirates bid were seen as preferable expansion locations.

The bid is also supported by Ipswich Mayor Anthony Antonelli and the City of Ipswich. It is also backed by Brothers Ipswich, despite the launch of a Brothers Confraternity NRL bid.

Many rugby league personalities, such as Johnathan Thurston and Sam Thaiday have also publicly supported the bid.

== Result ==
The push for a team West of Brisbane ultimately lost out to one to the North, with The Dolphins (Redcliffe) named successful in October of 2021, and joining the NRL for the 2023 season as its 17th team.

However, on the back of both the NRL's continued planned expansion into Perth and Papua New Guinea, and the population growth in South East Queensland ahead of the Brisbane 2032 Olympics, renewed pushes for an Ipswich-based NRL team emerged in the mid 2020's.
