= Saranne Cooke =

Australian businesswoman

Saranne Cooke is an Australian businesswoman. A professional director, her board roles include Chair of Racing New South Wales, the Royal Flying Doctor Service (South Eastern Section) and has recently been elected Chancellor of Charles Sturt University beginning in the role in December 2026. Cooke has held senior roles in the agribusiness, sport, education, health, aged care, finance, government, and not-for-profit sectors. She was recognised by the Sydney Daily Telegraph as one of the 100 most powerful and influential people in New South Wales in both 2024 and 2025, ranking 31st and 34th respectively.

== Early life and education ==
Cooke was born in Condobolin, New South Wales. She grew up in Bathurst and lived for a time in the remote town of Wilcannia, where her parents worked as teachers in outback communities. She attended Kelso High Campus (formerly Kelso High School) before graduating with a Bachelor of Commerce from the Australian National University in 1995. She later completed a Master of Business (Marketing) at Charles Sturt University, a Master of Commercial Law at Deakin University, and in 2019, a Doctor of Philosophy (PhD) focused on the governance of S&P/ASX200 companies.

== Career ==
=== Royal Flying Doctor Service ===
In 2019, Cooke joined the board of the Royal Flying Doctor Service (South Eastern Section). She was appointed Deputy Chair in 2021 and Chair in 2022. The organisation is recognised as the world’s largest aeromedical provider, delivering health care and emergency retrieval services across 7.69 million square kilometres of Australia. Under Cooke’s leadership, the service expanded its scope of operations, including primary health clinics, dental and mental health programs to people living in rural and remote areas.

=== Higher education ===
In August 2026, Cooke was elected Chancellor of Charles Sturt University (CSU), becoming the first graduate of the university to be appointed to the role. She will commence as Chancellor in December 2026. Cooke previously served as Deputy Chancellor of Charles Sturt University (CSU) until December 2025, having been first appointed to the CSU Council in 2013 by the New South Wales Minister for Education. Her work has included guiding the institution through government-driven reforms in tertiary education and the challenges posed by the COVID-19 pandemic. Following her election as Chancellor, Cooke identified regional access to higher education, graduate retention and the long-term sustainability of regional universities as key priorities. She has advocated for a university funding model that better reflects the higher costs of delivering education across dispersed regional campuses and has highlighted CSU's role in supporting regional workforces, noting that more than 80% of its graduates go on to live and work in regional Australia.

=== Racing New South Wales ===
Cooke was appointed to the board of Racing New South Wales in 2015 by the Minister for Gaming and Racing. Racing NSW regulates and operates New South Wales' AU$3.3 billion thoroughbred racing sector. She became Deputy Chair in 2019 and was elevated to Chair in 2024. Racing NSW is the statutory authority responsible for supervising and regulating thoroughbred racing in New South Wales. During her tenure, the organisation introduced the Everest, promoted as the world’s richest turf race, expanded the Spring Carnival, invested in enhanced animal welfare programs, and significantly increased prize money across the industry.

In 2021, while serving as deputy chair, she was the sole prospective buyer at an auction for a three-bedroom home adjacent to Racing NSW's Bathurst racecourse. According to the Sydney Morning Herald, Cooke "appeared as if she were any other property investor" and negotiated a price of $985,000. Although she acquired the property in her name, she transferred it eight months later to Racing NSW for $1, raising questions about whether Racing NSW was insufficiently transparent in its efforts to acquire land.

The land deal was investigated by NSW Gaming and Racing Minister David Harris after it was identified by NSW MP Mark Latham. Latham questioned whether the deal met "impeccable standards of integrity" required of Racing NSW. Cooke bought the property as Racing NSW's agent under a bare trust structure and did not receive any payment for her role. According to the Sydney Morning Herald, other parties in the transaction only discovered that she was acting for Racing NSW after the sale was completed, although there was nothing illegal about the lack of disclosure or any requirement to offer this information. Racing NSW said the transaction was designed to avoid paying a higher price at auction.

The NSW Gaming and Racing Minister’s investigation confirmed that there was no substance to Latham’s claims with the Minister advising that his Department sought advice from Revenue NSW which confirmed the statements by Cooke and Racing NSW that the correct stamp duty was paid. The NSW Minister for Finance also confirmed that Racing NSW had provided all information required under the relevant revenue ruling, that no duty was avoided and the correct stamp duty was paid.

In 2024, Cooke gave evidence during a NSW parliamentary inquiry into the unsuccessful attempt to sell Rosehill Gardens Racecourse for redevelopment. Asked about a submission made by Racing NSW that later became the subject of a parliamentary privileges inquiry, Cooke said the board had been fully briefed and that she approved of what the submissions were seeking to achieve. In October 2025, the Legislative Council Privileges Committee concluded that Racing NSW's actions did not meet the threshold for contempt of Parliament, but expressed serious concerns about its conduct. The committee described the provision of detailed adverse allegations about former employees as "deeply inappropriate" and said Racing NSW's behaviour may have deterred potential inquiry witnesses from coming forward for fear of reprisal or repercussion.

=== Other roles ===
Cooke is a director of Meat and Livestock Australia and Ageing Australia. She has also served as Chair of the Australasian College of Sport and Exercise Physicians and as the inaugural Chair of the Australian Institute of Company Directors’ Western Region Committee of NSW. Her previous board appointments include HESTA Superannuation and Leading Aged Services Australia.

She is a Fellow of both CPA Australia and the Australian Institute of Company Directors.

== Recognition ==
- Ranked 31st in the Sydney Daily Telegraph’s “100 Most Powerful and Influential People in NSW” list (2024).
- Ranked 34th in the Sydney Daily Telegraph’s “Sydney's Power 100” list (2025)
