= Mod league =

Modified form of rugby league for children

Mod league is a form of rugby league developed by the Australian Rugby League. It was developed to introduce children to rugby league.

Mod league follows on from mini football; it introduces laws more common to the full international laws of rugby league, whilst also keeping the theme of being an introductory level. It is a necessary bridge between mini footy and the full rigours of international rugby league laws.

== Similarities with Mini footy ==
- Tackles below the armpits
- Code of Conduct and safe play code enforced
- Every player must play a minimum of one unbroken half of football in each match
- Nationally accredited coaches, referees and first aid officers

== Changes to bridge the gap between mini footy to rugby league ==
- Kicking (without bombs)
- 40-minute halves ages 8,7,6
- Maximum number of players per team on the field at once is 11 at ages 9, 10, 11 and 13 at age 12
- 6 tackles
