= Brisbane Bombers =

Club information
- Full name: Brisbane Bombers Rugby League Football Club Limited
- Nickname: Bombers
- Colours: Primary: Navy; Secondary: Orange; Tertiary: Silver
- Founded: 2011
- Website: www.brisbanebombers.com.au

Current details
- Ground: Suncorp Stadium (52,500)
- Competition: National Rugby League

The Brisbane Bombers Rugby League Football Club Limited, commonly referred to as Brisbane Bombers were a proposed Australian professional rugby league football club to be based in the city of Brisbane, the capital of the state of Queensland. Founded in 2011, the Bombers sought entry into an expanded National Rugby League (NRL) for a decade, with their bid strategy based around a rivalry with the Brisbane Broncos, dubbed "The Battle for Brisbane".

The bid's directors were Nicholas Livermore, Chris Mangan and Michael Nash.

== History and catchment area ==
The Brisbane NRL Expansion bid launched in 2010, with the hopes of entering the NRL in 2013. Then-Channel 9 CEO David Gyngell publicly stated the NRL's television rights would be more attractive if the competition included a second Brisbane based NRL side.

In 2011, the bid launched their name and emblem to the media, becoming known as the Brisbane Bombers. The name immediately drew the ire of AFL club Essendon Bombers, who vowed to fight to keep their identity. However, no action was ever taken, and the Brisbane expansion bid continued to use the Bombers nickname.

The Bombers' proposed catchment area included Logan City Council, Redland Bay Council, Ipswich City Council, Brisbane City Council as well as the Moreton Bay and Sunshine Coast Regional Councils. They also aimed to set up junior development programs in the north, south and west of Brisbane.

As the NRL continued to delay discussions on expanding the competition, the Bombers aimed high, reportedly targeting rugby union players Quade Cooper and Sonny Bill Williams as marquee signings if their bid was successful.

In February 2021, it was announced that the Brisbane Bombers and Western Corridor bids would merge to form one bid, known as the Brisbane Jets, in an attempt to compete with the Redcliffe Dolphins and Brisbane Firehawks bids.

== Name and emblem ==
After conducting market research, in March 2011, the bid group announced 15 shortlisted names fans could nominate via the bid website, along with colours and jersey designs, and the winning name would be announced via a radio sponsor. The shortlisted names were:

Location Name	Mascot
Brisbane	Barracudas, Bayliners, Bobcats, Bombers, Braves, Brewers, Buccaneers, Heat
Eastern	Stingrays
Rivercity	Kookaburras
South Queensland	Cyclones, Dolphins, Rogues, Spartans, Taipans

After 12,000 responses, on 14 July 2011, the bid launched its brand at Albion Park, revealing the bid club's name, colours and logo. The club's colours were to be navy blue, orange and silver.

== Ambassadors ==
The club had ambassadors to promote the message of 'bringing more League to Brisbane' and to ensure that grass-roots clubs would benefit from the bid. The ambassadors are Scott Sattler and Billy Moore.

== Playing arena ==
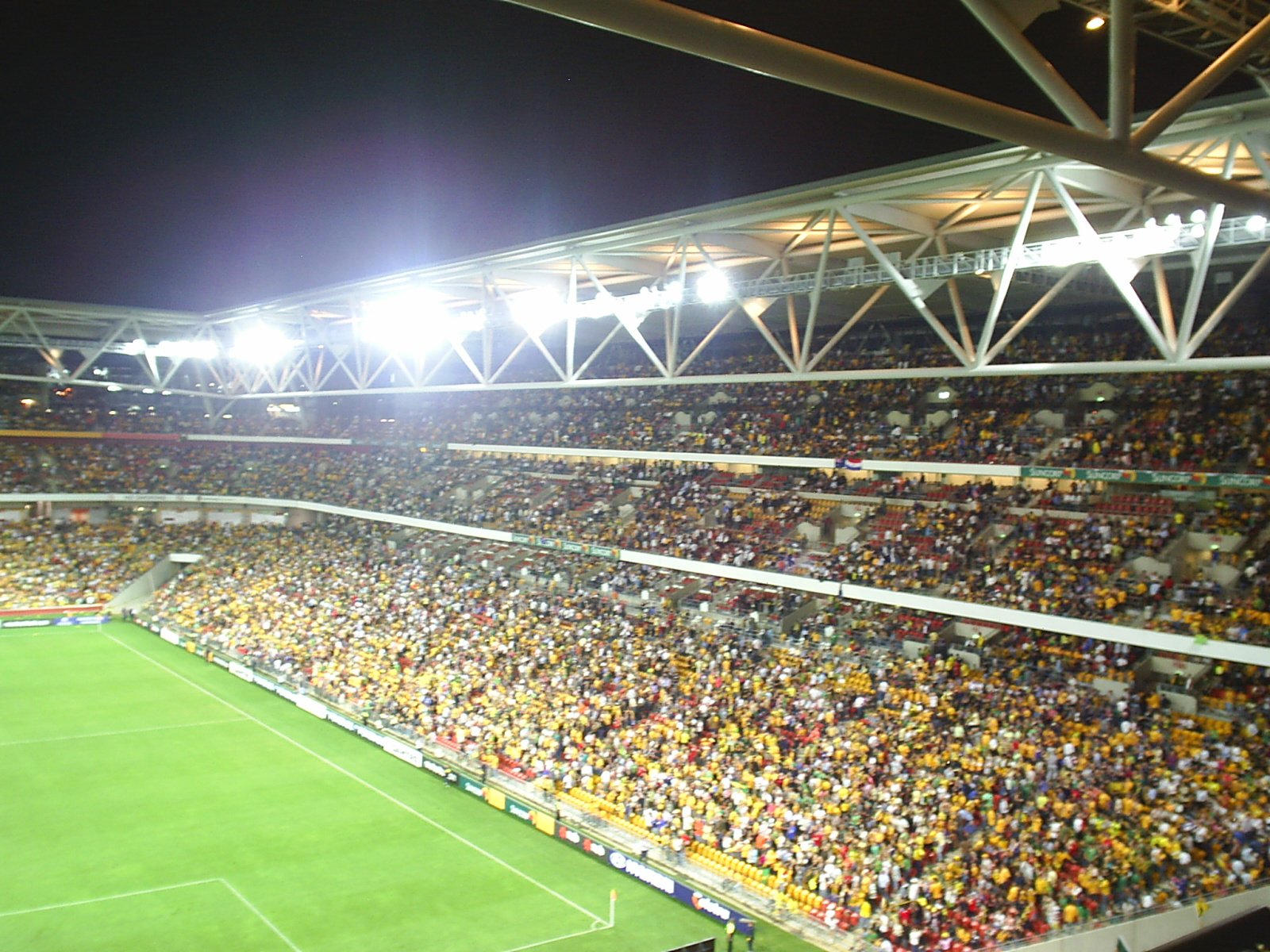
Suncorp Stadium, Brisbane

The Brisbane Bombers intended on playing all home games at Brisbane's Suncorp Stadium. It was speculated there was a number of options for a home base including Davies Park in South Brisbane, Dolphin Park, Redcliffe and two locations in Redlands.
