= Racing NSW =

Australian thoroughbred racing regulator

Racing New South Wales
- Sport: Thoroughbred horse racing
- Jurisdiction: New South Wales
- Abbreviation: Racing NSW
- Founded: 1996
- Chairperson: Saranne Cooke
- CEO: Peter V'landys
- Operating income: A$300 million+ (annual recurring)

Racing New South Wales, or Racing NSW, is a body corporate established under section 4 of the Thoroughbred Racing Act 1996 (NSW) to control, supervise and regulate thoroughbred horse racing in the state of New South Wales.

Racing NSW provides funding derived from wagering revenue. Racing NSW's initiatives have reported more than $3 billion of additional funding for the NSW Thoroughbred Racing Industry, with these initiatives now generating recurring income of over $300 million annually.

== Role and functions ==
Racing NSW regulates thoroughbred racing throughout New South Wales. Its functions include licensing participants, enforcing racing rules and integrity standards, allocating industry funding, and administering race programming and prize money. The organisation’s responsibilities extend to metropolitan, provincial and country sectors of the state’s racing industry.

== Governance ==
=== Board ===
The Chairperson of Racing NSW is Saranne Cooke, who was appointed in 2024, becoming the first woman in the role. She had previously served on the board from 2015 and previously in the role as Deputy Chair. The Racing NSW Board consists of the following members:

- Saranne Cooke (Chairman)
- George Souris (Deputy Chair)
- Simon Tuxen
- Anthony Shepherd
- Michael Crismale
- Garry Charny
- Kevin Greene
- Peter V'landys

The Chief Executive Officer (CEO) of Racing NSW is Peter V’landys. V’landys has held the CEO position since 2004.

== Major races ==
=== The Everest ===
The Everest is a Group 1 Weight for Age Thoroughbred horse race run over 1,200 metres on turf at Royal Randwick Racecourse in Sydney, Australia. It was elevated to Group 1 status in 2024.

The race’s total prizemoney rose from A$10 million at its inauguration in 2017 to A$15 million in 2018 and A$20 million in 2023. The Everest is staged annually in October and is the feature event of the Sydney spring racing carnival.

=== The Golden Eagle ===
The Golden Eagle is a thoroughbred horse race run over 1,500 metres on turf at Royal Randwick Racecourse in Sydney, Australia on the last Saturday in October. The race is restricted to four-year-old horses and is run under set-weight conditions.

The inaugural running took place at Rosehill Racecourse in 2019, with prizemoney of $10 million. Ten per cent of prizemoney from each starter’s share is allocated to a charity nominated by the horse’s connections.

=== Other notable races ===
The Everest and The Golden Eagle were the two most wagered-upon thoroughbred races in New South Wales during the 2023–24 season. Other recently introduced races such as the Five Diamonds, King Charles III Stakes, Silver Eagle and Kosciuszko also ranked among the most bet-on events.

== See also ==
- Thoroughbred racing in Australia
