= Todd Greenberg =

Australian rugby league administrator (born 1971)

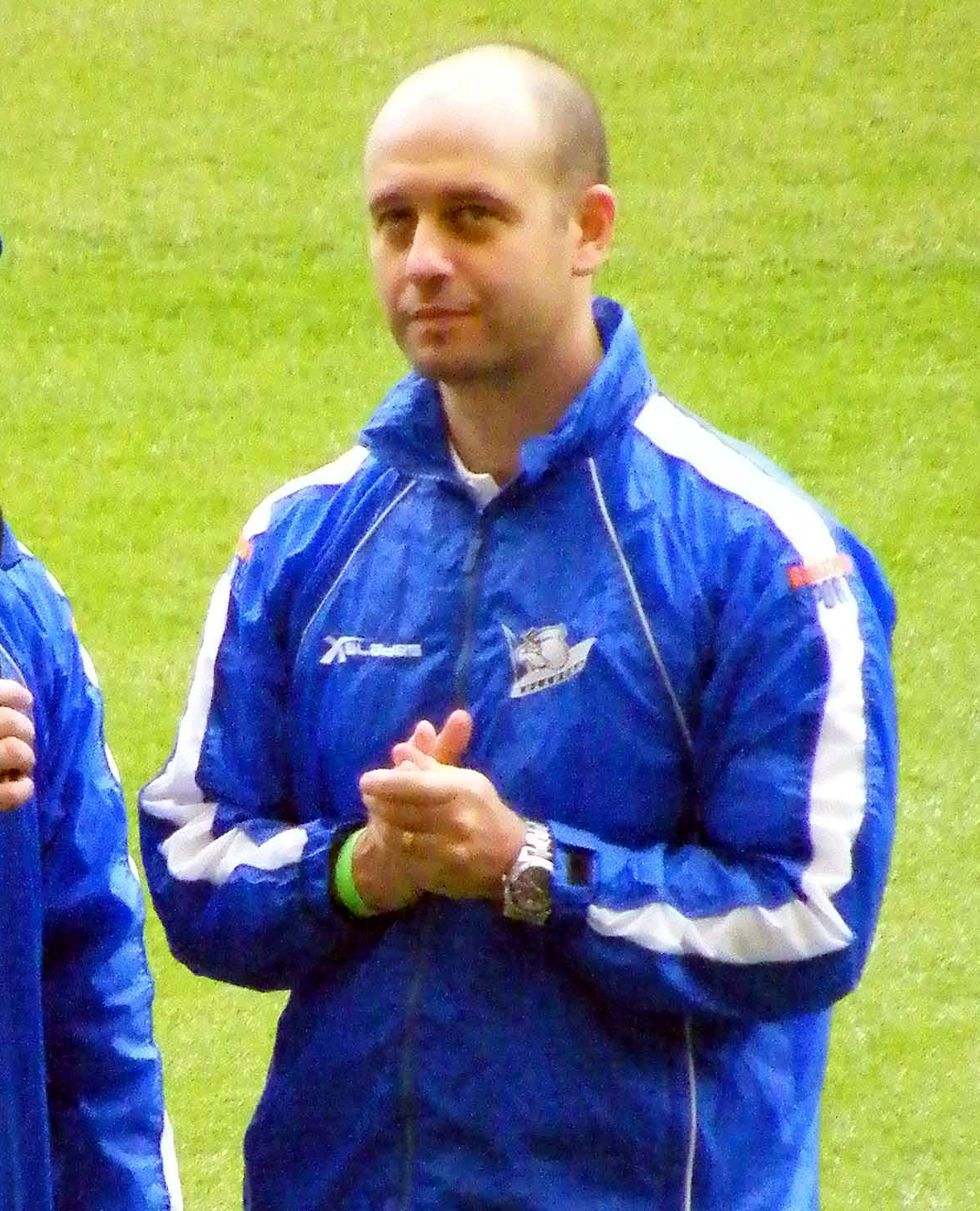
- Born: 16 July 1971 (age 55); Sydney, New South Wales, Australia
- Education: University of New South Wales; University of Technology, Sydney
- Occupation: Sports administrator
- Years active: 1993–present
- Spouse: Lisa Greenberg

Todd Greenberg (born 16 July 1971) is an Australian sports administrator who was chief executive officer of the NRL from March 2016 to April 2020. In January 2021 he was appointed as chief executive officer of the Australian Cricketers' Association. He left the role in 2025 to become the CEO of Cricket Australia.

== Background ==
Greenberg was born in 1971 in Sydney, New South Wales, Australia. He is Jewish. He went to high school at Sydney Tech. His grandfather, Len Greenberg, was the first medical officer to the New South Wales Rugby League.

== Career ==
Greenberg represented Australia in cricket at two editions of the Maccabiah Games, an international multi-sport event for Jewish athletes.

Greenberg completed a sports science degree at the University of New South Wales and a part-time master's degree at University of Technology Sydney.

Between 1993 and 1998, Greenberg worked for Cricket NSW as Events & Promotions Manager. Greenberg joined the NRL club Canterbury-Bankstown Bulldogs in 2001 as Operations and Events Manager. He then left in 2001 to become the General Manager of Stadium Australia. In 2008, he returned to Canterbury-Bankstown, taking on the position of CEO, a role he held with the Belmore club until 2013; when he was appointed the Head of Football for the NRL.

In March 2016, Greenberg was appointed chief executive officer of the NRL, succeeding David Smith. Greenberg stepped down as CEO on April 20, 2020.

In January 2021, it was announced that Greenberg had been appointed as chief executive officer of the Australian Cricketers' Association, succeeding Alistair Nicholson in the role.

In March 2025, Greenberg became CEO of Cricket Australia.

Preceded by David Smith	National Rugby League CEO; 2016–2020	Succeeded by Andrew Abdo
