= Neil Whittaker =

Australian rugby league footballer and administrator

Personal information
- Full name: Neil David Whittaker
- Born: 10 September 1956 (age 70) Crookwell, New South Wales, Australia

Playing information
- Position: Hooker
Club
Years	Team	Pld	T	G	FG	P
1979–85	Balmain	118	11	0	1	56

Coaching information
Club
Years	Team	Gms	W	D	L	W%
1988	Huddersfield	1	0	0	1	0
- Source: As of 12 March 2019

Neil Whittaker (born 10 September 1956) is an Australian former professional rugby league footballer who played in the 1970s and 1980s for Balmain in the NSWRL competition. Whittaker was also the Chief Executive Officer of the National Rugby League from 1998 to 1999.

== Background ==
Whittaker was born in Crookwell, New South Wales, Australia. He worked for CSR as an engineer, winning Engineers Australia's EG Bishop engineering prize for top graduating student in mechanical or production engineering.

== Playing career ==
Whittaker made his first grade debut for Balmain in round 6 in 1979 against Newtown at Henson Park. Over the following seven seasons, Whittaker became the club's first choice hooker and captained the side. Towards the end of his playing career, Whittaker mainly played from the bench after the emergence of Benny Elias. Whittaker retired from playing at the end of 1985.

== Post playing ==
In 1994, Whittaker became chairman of Balmain and was one of the backers behind the club changing its name and location to become more marketable. It was decided in 1995 that Balmain would change their name to the Sydney Tigers and play their home games at Parramatta Stadium. The move started in the same year that the Super League war had begun. By the end of 1996, Balmain reverted to their original name and returned to playing at Leichhardt Oval for the 1997 season as the Sydney Tigers experiment was deemed a failure.

In February 1997, Whittaker was appointed John Quayle's successor as Chief Executive of the New South Wales Rugby League. In July 1997, Whittaker was one of the main stakeholders that began talks with the Parramatta Eels as Balmain were looking to merge with another club.

At the end of 1997, Whittaker helped broker the deal that led to the reunification of the game in January 1998 as the ARL/Super League war was declared over. One condition of the peace agreement between the Australian Rugby League and News Limited was that there would be a 14 team competition in 2000. The 20 clubs that played in 1998 would be assessed on various items such as sponsorship, crowds, on-field success and the like. It was also announced that clubs that merged would receive a large sum of money, as well as a guaranteed position in the 2000 NRL Competition.

As NRL CEO, Whittaker oversaw clubs such as Hunter Mariners, South Queensland Crushers, Adelaide Rams and the Western Reds culled from the competition. Whittaker was also NRL CEO at a difficult time when foundation clubs such as Balmain and Western Suburbs merged to form the Wests Tigers and North Sydney and South Sydney being axed from the competition.

Whittaker resigned as NRL CEO at the end of the 1999 season.

Sporting positions
Preceded by Jack Addy; 1987	Coach Huddersfield Giants; 1988	Succeeded by Nigel Stephenson; 1989
