= Big Dance (horse race) =

- Location: Randwick Racecourse
- Inaugurated: 2022
- Race type: Thoroughbred flat

Race information
- Distance: 1,600 metres
- Surface: Turf
- Track: Right-handed
- Purse: $3 million (2024)

The Big Dance is an Australian Turf Club thoroughbred horse race run over 1,600 metres at Randwick Racecourse in Sydney, Australia.

It was run for the first time on 1 November 2022, with prizemoney of $2 million, restricted to horses contesting one of the 25 selected New South Wales country Cups.

Initially it was said it would be held 30 minutes after Australia's largest horse race, the Melbourne Cup. The 2022 race started at 2:20pm preceding the Melbourne Cup by 40 minutes. Then half an hour after the Melbourne Cup Randwick holds an associated race, the Little Dance, a consolation race for horses that failed to qualify for the Big Dance.

== Race results ==
Year	Stake	Winner	Jockey	Trainer(s)	Time	Second	Third
2025	$3,000,000	Gringotts	Nash Rawiller	Ciaron Maher	1:35.64	Vivy Air	Lugh
2024	$3,000,000	Gringotts	Tommy Berry	Ciaron Maher	1:34.43	Vivy Air	Suparazi
2023	$3,000,000	Attractable	Regan Bayliss	Sara Ryan, Wyong	1:34.49	Cepheus	Super Helpful
2022	$2,000,000	Rustic Steel	Nash Rawiller	Kris Lees, Newcastle	1:33.87	Cisco Bay	Sibaaq
