= Australian Rugby League Commission =

Official governing body of rugby league football within Australia

Australian Rugby League Commission Limited
- Sport: Rugby league
- Jurisdiction: National
- Abbreviation: ARL
- Founded: 1986 as Australian Rugby Football League Limited, successor to 1924 ARFL Board of Control
- Affiliation: International Rugby League
- Affiliation date: 1998
- Regional affiliation: Asia-Pacific Rugby League
- Affiliation date: 2010 (full; founder)
- Headquarters: Rugby League Central; Driver Avenue, Moore Park, New South Wales
- Chairman: Peter V’landys AM (since October 2019)
- CEO: Peter V’landys AM (since September 2026)
- Men's coach: Kevin Walters (since July 2025)
- Women's coach: Jess Skinner (since February 2025)

Official website
- www.nrl.com/about-us/arl-commission
- (Australia)

The Australian Rugby League Commission Limited (ARL), formerly the Australian Rugby Football League Limited is an Australian rugby league football competition operator.

It was founded in 1986 as the Australian Rugby Football League Limited and succeeded the Australian Rugby Football League Board of Control which had been formed in 1924. Since its inception, the ARL has administered the Australian national team and represented Australia in international rugby league matters. Prior to 1998, the code in Australia had been principally administered by individual state leagues on a domestic basis, and the ARL on a national and international basis.

== Competitions ==
The ARL controls the National Rugby League and NRL Women's Premiership as well as annual representative competitions such as the State of Origin series, the Indigenous All Stars Match, the Affiliated States Championship and the Women's National Championships.

The ARL previously ran the National Youth Competition. This competition, which was for male players Under 20 years of age, was replaced in 2018 by state-run competitions. The New South Wales Rugby League run the Jersey Flegg Cup for male Under 21 players. The Queensland Rugby League run the Mal Meninga Cup for male Under 18 players, with players Under 21 that are outside NRL squads playing for clubs in the open-age Queensland Cup.

== History ==
Rugby league started in Australia in the period 1907–08.

The Australian Rugby Football League Board of Control was formed by the New South Wales Rugby League (NSWRL) and Queensland Rugby League (QRL) in December 1924 to administer the running of the national team. George Ball was the first secretary of the Board and John La Maro the first chairman. Prior to this time, the international rugby league was organised jointly by the NSWRL and the QRL. It was only after this time that the Australian team began to wear the now-familiar sporting colours of Green and Gold. Since 1924, rugby league bodies in all other states and territories became affiliated to the Board of Control and ARL.

Until 1984 the ARFL Board of Control was effectively run by the NSWRL board, and many Queensland players and administrators throughout this period believed that the NSWRL used this power to the detriment of Queenslanders, especially with respect to national team selection. In 1986 the ARL was incorporated under the name Australian Rugby Football League Limited as a separate entity and Ken Arthurson was the first executive chairman of the new body.

With national expansion of the former NSWRL premiership competition implemented for the 1995 season the NSWRL passed control of the Winfield Cup competition to the ARL.

Following Kerry Packer's announcement that his Optus Vision company owned both free-to-air and pay television broadcasting rights for the sport in Australia, News Corporation, controlled by Rupert Murdoch, undertook a bold bid to create a rival competition, Super League (Australia). Super League successfully attracted eight of the ARL clubs.

In the 1995 State of Origin series, the ARL forbade the players of those eight clubs from participating in the interstate competition. However, those clubs were allowed to participate in the premiership seasons of 1995 and 1996, while the ARL fought in the courtroom to stop the Super League competition from eventuating. However, Super League conducted a rival competition in 1997.

Both the ARL and Super League competitions ran parallel to each other that year. At the close of the season, despite having the financial backing of Optus, the ARL decided that it could not survive if two competitions were run and undertook moves to approach News Corporation and join the national competition that had been created by Super League. As a consequence of the negotiations that followed, the National Rugby League was formed before the 1998 season from the ARL and Super League competitions.

From 1998 to 2012, the National Rugby League Partnership, a power-sharing arrangement between News Corporation and the Australian Rugby League (ARL), ran the National Rugby League competition as a consequence of the Super League war. Between the 1998 season and the first few months of the 2012 season the ARL had six out of twelve seats on the NRL Partnership board. In 2012 News Limited exited the partnership on condition that the ARL was restructured with an independent board.

The ARL was renamed as the Australian Rugby League Commission and restructured on 10 February 2012 and took control of the National Rugby League competition.

=== ARL Premiership, 1995–97 ===
Australian Rugby League
- Sport: Rugby league
- Inaugural season: 1995
- Ceased: 1997
- Replaced by: National Rugby League
- Number of teams: 10
- Country: Australia
- Broadcast partner: Nine Network; C7 Sport

From 1995 to 1997, the ARL directly administered the national club premiership competition. Although they only won one ARL premiership in 1996, the Manly-Warringah Sea Eagles dominated the competition in its three years under the ARL name, winning each minor premiership (1995–1997), and appearing in all three Grand Finals.

Season	Grand Final Information			Minor Premiers
Season	Premiers	Score	Runners-Up	Minor Premiers
1995	Sydney Bulldogs	17–4	Manly-Warringah	Manly-Warringah
1996	Manly-Warringah	20–8	St. George	Manly-Warringah
1997	Newcastle Knights	22–16	Manly-Warringah	Manly-Warringah

== ARL Development ==
ARL Development is a non-profit company that was formed by the ARL to develop the sport from an introductory level to the age of 18 years. In achieving this, ARL Development has developed new modified codes that gradually introduce children to rugby league. This is done by restricting the rules and then gradually releasing these restrictions.

The two introductory modified codes currently in use are mini footy and mod league. On completion of mod league, players make a move to full international rugby league laws.

== Organisation structure ==
The ARL is governed by a board of directors, referred to as a “commission”. The board was previously composed of representatives of member clubs and state leagues but was reconstituted with directors independent of the member clubs and leagues and renamed as a “commission”. It is headquartered in Sydney at “Rugby League Central”, Moore Park, New South Wales.

All 17 National Rugby League clubs and the New South Wales Rugby League and the Queensland Rugby League are members of the commission. This means that the commission has 19 shareholder members in total.

=== Primary objects ===
The primary objects of the ARL are to:

1. Be the single controlling body and administrator of the Game;
2. Foster, develop, extend and provide adequate funding for the Game from the junior to elite levels and generally to act in the best interests of the Game;
3. Liaise with and delegate appropriate functions to governing bodies of the Game in the States and Territories of Australia, including the NSWRL and QRL;
4. Organise and conduct all State of Origin and Australian Representative Games;
5. Organise, conduct and foster the NRL Competition;
6. Liaise with the Rugby League International Federation Limited and organisations controlling the game in other countries in the fostering and control of the game of Rugby League throughout the world;
7. Promote and encourage either directly or indirectly the physical, cultural and intellectual welfare of young people in the community and, in particular, the Rugby League community;
8. Promote and encourage either directly or indirectly sport and recreation, particularly Rugby League football, in the interests of the social welfare of young persons.

=== Commissioners ===
The appointment of the original nine commissioners was intensely followed by the media. Placement firm Spencer Stuart shortlisted a list of potential members and the NRL Partnership whittled it down to the current members. Commissioners were required to not have had any link to any rugby league football governing body or organisation for the previous 2 years to ensure their independence.

The inaugural ARL Commissioners were agreed by representatives of the NRL Partnership, the Leagues and the NRL clubs. Future Commissioners are appointed by the Commission itself.

=== Election of Commissioners ===
The Commissioners are appointed into different groups and, initially, for differing terms. Each Commissioner must, at a nominated time, resign and seek re-election at an Annual General Meeting. Commissioners in Group A were required to stand down before the 2013 Annual General Meeting, where they were able to re-apply for their position. Group B members were required to stand down before the 2014 AGM and Group C members were required to stand down before the 2015 meeting.

Ten members may, with the additional support of both the NSW and Queensland Rugby Leagues, vote to remove a Commissioner. Fourteen members are required to remove a Commissioner without the support of both the NSW and Queensland Rugby Leagues. Should either of these events occur, the remaining Commissioners would appoint a replacement. A Commissioner who has been removed from office may not seek re-appointment for a period of three years.

Name	Role	Group	Appointed	Ref
Peter V'landys	Executive Chair	B	2018	
Wayne Pearce	Commissioner	C	2012	
Tony McGrath	Commissioner	A	2014	
Gary Weiss	Commissioner	C	2016	
Peter Beattie	Commissioner	A	2017	
Megan Davis	Commissioner	B	2017	
Kate Jones	Commissioner	B	2020	
Alan Sullivan	Commissioner		2022	

Peter V'landys was appointed Chair on 30 October 2019, replacing Peter Beattie who reverted to a commissioner role. Beattie had served as Chair since February 2018. Andrew Abdo served as Interim CEO from late April 2020 until his appointment as CEO in early September 2020. Abdo resigned as CEO in 2026, with V'landys replacing him as interim CEO before being appointed as Executive Chair in September 2026.

=== Former commissioners ===
David Gallop was the initial chief executive officer of the restructured ARL Commission. He was previously the CEO of the NRL and his contract extension to become inaugural ARL CEO was a condition placed by News Limited with the ARL. On 5 June 2012 the ARL announced Gallop's departure from the CEO position and that he would take up a position at the FFA in 2013. David Smith was announced as the new ARL CEO in November 2012, taking charge on 1 February 2013.

Name	Role	Group	Appointed	Departed	Ref
Gary Pemberton	Commissioner	A	2012	2013	
Peter Gregg	Commissioner	A	2012	2014	
Ian Elliott	Commissioner	C	2012	2016	
Jeremy Sutcliffe	Commissioner	B	2012	2017	
Catherine Harris	Commissioner	B	2012	2018	
John Grant	Chair	B	2012	2018	
Chris Sarra	Commissioner	C	2012	2019	
Graeme Samuel	Commissioner	A	2013	2017	
Amanda Laing	Commissioner	B	2018	2020	
Mark Coyne	Commissioner	C	2019	2019	

=== Former chief executive officers ===
Name	Appointed	Departed	Ref
David Smith	2013	2015	
Todd Greenberg	2016	2020	
Andrew Abdo	2020	2026	
