= David Smith (executive) =

British sports administrator

Dave Smith
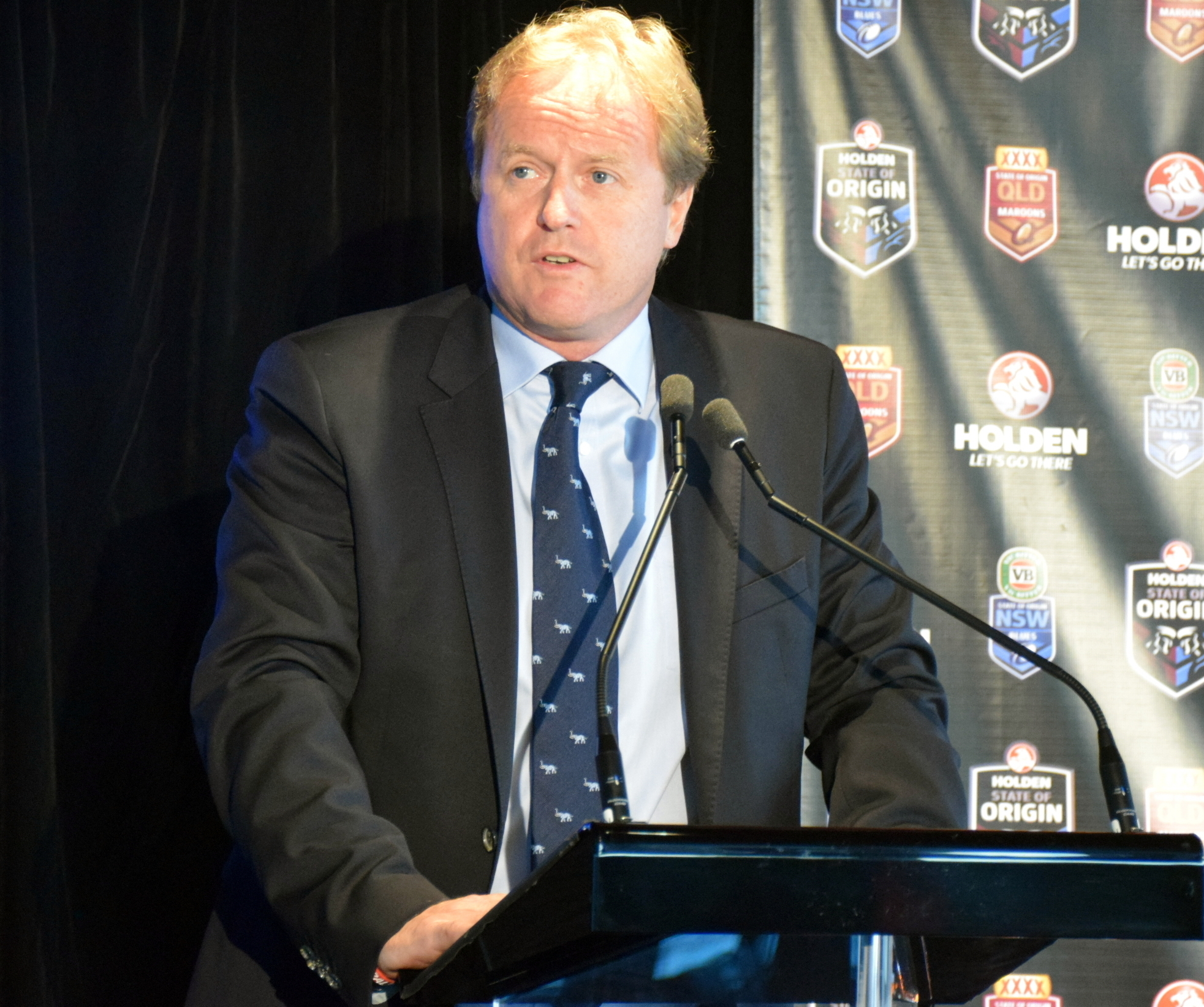
- Born: David Smith; Wales
- Known for: former CEO of the NRL

David Smith was the chief executive of the Australian Rugby League Commission which manages the National Rugby League (NRL). He previously worked in the banking sector in the United Kingdom and Australia.

== Business ==
Smith has an engineering background. He began his banking career with Morgan Grenfell & Co in 1987. After this position, he held a number of senior management positions in Deutsche Bank, UBS and Lloyds International Pty Ltd.

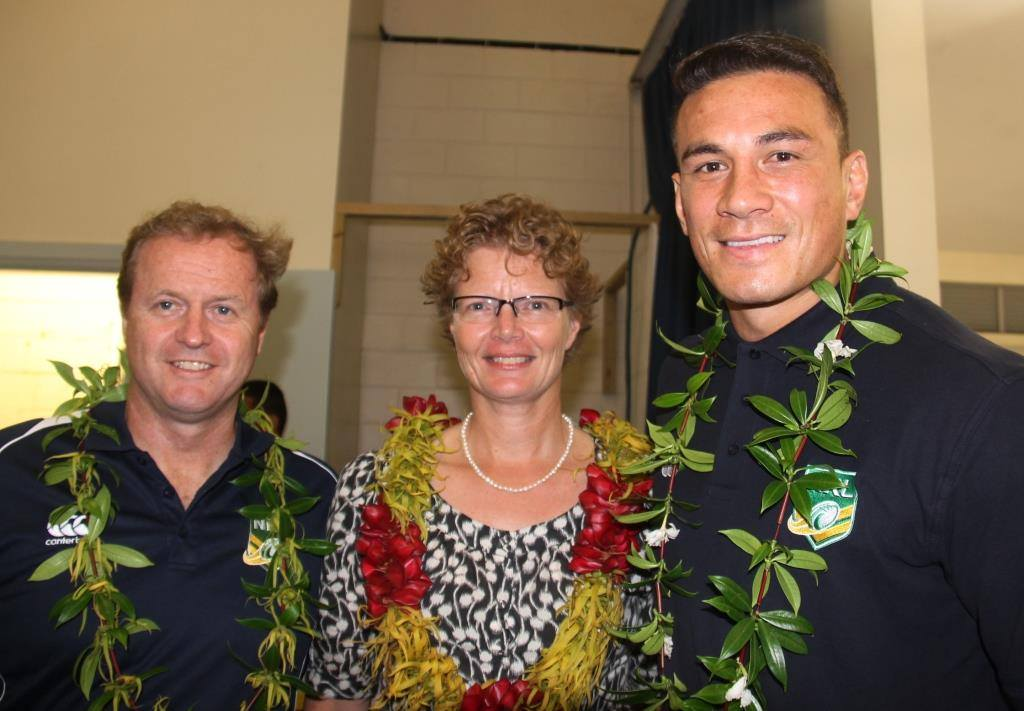
David Smith with Sue Langford and Sonny Bill Williams in 2014.

From September 2005 to March 2009, Smith was Head of Bank of Scotland Treasury Australia (later part of Lloyds International Pty Ltd. He was Chief Executive Officer and Managing Director of Lloyds International Pty Ltd. (formerly known as HBOS Australia Pty Ltd), a subsidiary of Lloyds Banking Group from March 2009 to November 2012. As CEO, Smith had responsibility for 10 countries, 1500 staff and managing assets of $A50 billion.

== Rugby League ==
He was appointed Chief Executive Officer of the Australian Rugby League Commission in November 2012 and took up the appointment on 1 February 2013, and left the post on 30 November 2015. He replaced David Gallop. In making the appointment, ARLC Chairman John Grant stated "This is a person who knows business, who knows how to lead, who loves sport, who is culturally suited to our game and who has a very strong sense of community." It was noted that he did not have a background in rugby league but had played rugby union in Wales. Before his tenure ended, he secured a record free-to-air broadcast deal with the Nine Network. After his resignation, John Grant was appointed acting CEO.

Preceded by David Gallop	National Rugby League CEO; 2013–15	Succeeded by Todd Greenberg
