= David Moffett =

Australian rugby administrator

- Born: 17 April 1947 (age 79); Doncaster, England
- Occupations: Businessman, sports executive

David Moffett (born 17 April 1947) is a businessman who has been the head of Sport England, New Zealand Rugby, Australia's National Rugby League, and the Welsh Rugby Union. Moffett has been involved in New Zealand politics, serving briefly on the board of the New Conservative Party and founding a political party, New NZ; this party later merged with the Outdoors Party and Moffett became its executive director.

== Biography ==
David Moffett was born in Doncaster in Yorkshire, England. His family moved to Kenya when he was three, and he was raised in Kenya and Tanganyika during the last years of colonial Africa. He moved to Australia at age sixteen with his father after his parents split up.

Moffett has a son Graeme who he says he named after the rugby league player Graeme Langlands. Moffett also has a daughter named Kirsten.

Moffett is a naturalised Australian, though as of 2019 Moffett was living in rural north Canterbury in New Zealand, owning 10 hectares as a blockholder.

== Sports administration ==
Moffett's roles in sports administration have included:

- An administrator at the International Rugby Board;
- One of the chief architects of SANZAR (South Africa, New Zealand and Australia Rugby) in 1996;
- Executive director of the New South Wales Rugby Union, starting in 1992;
- Chief executive at the New Zealand Rugby Union from 1996 to 2000, being the first non-New Zealander to hold the role;
- Chief executive at Australia's National Rugby League, starting in 1999. The appointment of a rugby union executive to oversee rugby league led to speculation that he was there to merge the two sports, but this did not eventuate. He held this position until 2001;
- Chief executive of Sport England: Moffett left Sport England acrimoniously in 2002 after only 10 months in the job, and complained that he was restricted "by too many committees run by too many blazers". He earned £140,000 a year in the role;
- Chef executive officer of the Welsh Rugby Union (WRU) from 2002 to 2005.

Moffett was offered the role of chief executive for the English Football Association in 2003, but turned the position down.

=== Welsh Rugby Union ===
Moffett was the CEO of the Welsh Rugby Union (WRU) from 2002 to 2005. He took up his post at the WRU on 2 December 2002 having beaten off over 100 other applicants to the job, and immediately set about controlling the WRU's finances who were by this time heavily in debt (around £55 million) due to poor management of funds and expenditure on facilities such as the Millennium Stadium. Moffett created an 18-man board of directors, replacing a 27-man committee as part of his streamlining of administration at the Union.

Moffett also gained backing to dismiss the Wales 'A' Team, long considered an important development side playing at a level just below that of full international level, in order to save money and develop rugby players at a higher level.

==== Regional Rugby ====
However the most controversial decision Moffett took was the introduction of regional rugby to Wales. After much discussion with the clubs, he got his wish and for the 2003–04 season five regions were created, some jointly owned by two of the former clubs and two (Llanelli Scarlets and Cardiff Blues) were owned by only one club, prompting complaints of favouritism from supporters of the other clubs. During the 2003–04 season 50% of the ownership of the Celtic Warriors region was given to the WRU by Leighton Samuel who had acquired the Pontypridd share because that club was effectively bankrupt. At the end of the 2003–04 season Leighton Samuel, the owner of the other 50% of the region sold his share to the WRU. Following the WRU's decision to become 100% shareholders in the club; they found it had debts of about £300,000 although payment of most of that was able to be deferred. With the lowest support base of all the new provincial teams and determined to eradicate Welsh Rugby's financial difficulties, the Celtic Warriors team was dissolved leaving just four regional teams; this had been Moffett's original intention. Moffett was able to dissolve the Celtic Warriors with the help of WRU Chairman David Pickering by getting the remaining four regions to give £312,500 each to buy off Leighton Samuel. Samuel alleged that he only sold his share in the Warriors to the WRU because they agreed to keep the region going. The WRU denied this but Leighton Samuel took them to court and the WRU settled out of court. The regions each receive over £3 million a year from the WRU, although originally Llanelli Scarlets and Cardiff Blues received less than the others, as a punishment for going alone.

With regard to the debt caused by the Millennium Stadium, on 24 November 2004, it was announced that Moffett had secured a deal with Barclays Bank to repay £45 million over 35 years and for the remaining £10 million of the debt to incur no interest and not to be repaid unless the WRU or the Millennium Stadium Plc default or sell the stadium or enter into partnership with a third party within the said period of thirty-five years. As part of this deal with Barclays, the WRU Group cleared its debt to BT for the land on which the stadium was built. He also secured permission from the Millennium Commission, who had provided a grant for the construction of the stadium to obtain a sponsor for naming rights of the stadium on condition that the word Millennium remained in the name.

==== WRU Group Chief Executive Resignation ====
Moffett signed an extension to his contract which would see him remain at the WRU until 2008 in March 2004. However, on 29 September 2005 he announced his resignation to take effect on 31 December 2005. He cited personal and family reasons for his departure.

Under his command the WRU went from making a loss of £3.7 million in the year he joined, to making a profit of £3.6 million in the year he left. The WRU decided not to replace him, instead sharing his duties between the Millennium Stadium manager, Paul Sergeant and WRU Chief Executive Steve Lewis. Although following the Mike Ruddock affair in February 2006, the WRU decided to replace him with Roger Lewis.

==== Later involvement ====
In 2014, Moffett drove a vote of no confidence in the WRU board of directors. While Moffett had enough backing to call a meeting, it was defeated 18-453.

== Politics ==
Moffett first made political news in December 2018 when he attacked Jacinda Ardern and Winston Peters, the Prime Minister and Deputy Prime Minister of New Zealand, over a non-binding UN migration compact which the government supported. He called them "traitors" and "leftards" and said: "Next year will likely be your Annus Horibilis because we are coming to get you." These tweets, along attacks on other politicians such as Angela Merkel, received coverage in New Zealand and Britain due to his rugby profile.

By the time of these comments, Moffett was a member of the New Conservative Party, and in January 2019, Moffett announced that he had been appointed to its board. Moffett's time in the board appears to have been short; by September 2019 the New Conservative's website no longer listed him as a part of the leadership team.

In 2019, Moffett founded a political party called the New NZ party (later renamed Real NZ). Journalist Alex Braae described the New NZ party in May 2019 as "a vehicle for David Moffett which is at this stage is unregistered, and mainly appears to consist of aggressive social media posting." The party announced former United Future MP Marc Alexander as its leader. According to its website, the party's policies included opposing "open borders, interference by the UN, Government excess, waste and interference, far left and right ideologies, the PC brigade, tyranny by minorities, unlawful religious beliefs and terrorism". On its website, it used the slogan "WWG1WGA", also used by the QAnon conspiracy theory.

In March 2020, the New Zealand Outdoors Party announced that it had joined with the Real NZ Party, that David Moffett had become a board member for the Outdoors Party, and that he was now the party's executive director. In a press release, Moffett said "it became apparent that the Real NZ Party was not going to reach the 500 member threshold to form a party" and so the party talked with the Outdoors Party. The Real NZ Party also offered to endorse the New Zealand Public Party and to allow the Public Party to take on any of Real NZ's policies.

Moffett had previously considered running for parliament himself. But he did not contest the 2020 election himself either on a party list or for an electorate.

== Rugby Rules ==
In August 2020, Moffett launched a new version of rugby called 'Rugby Rules'. The rules of Rugby Rules were written mainly by Moffett, with assistance from rugby union player Enrique Rodriguez. It follows his frequent criticism of modern rugby, both the rules of the game and the structure of professional competitions.

Preceded by Neil Whittaker	National Rugby League CEO; 1999-2001	Succeeded by David Gallop
