= Andrew Abdo =

Australian sports administrator

- Born: 1977 or 1978 (age 48–49); Eastern Cape, South Africa
- Occupation: Outgoing CEO of the National Rugby League Incoming CEO of Tennis Australia
- Spouse: Annalisa

Andrew Abdo (born 1977 or 1978) is a South African and Australian sports administrator who is the current CEO of Tennis Australia, having taken up the role in August 2026. He was previously the CEO of the National Rugby League, a role he held until July 2026.

== Early life and education ==
Abdo was educated at Selborne College in East London, South Africa in the early 1990s. Abdo worked to obtain a business science qualification from the University of Cape Town between 1995 and 1998. Abdo received an Master of Business Administration (MBA) from the University of Pretoria in 2006.

== Career ==
Abdo worked as a financial accountant with Deloitte from 1993 until 2003 while he was in South Africa and Bermuda. In Johannesburg, Abdo worked in business development and project management for Learninglab from 2004 to 2005. Abdo worked as the director at professional development company Atcor from 2005 to 2011. From 2005 to 2011, Abdo was simultaneously working as a non-executive director at the South African Forestry Company where he led the finance committee. In 2012, Abdo moved to Sydney and worked for Deloitte Australia, he worked at Deloitte Australia until 2013. While working at Deloitte, Abdo served as director in the private growth advisory practice.

Abdo was chief commercial officer for the National Rugby League (NRL) from 2013 until his appointment as CEO in September 2020, succeeding Todd Greenberg.

Abdo resigned from his role as CEO of the NRL in May 2026. Upon announcing his resignation from the NRL, Abdo stated that he would join Tennis Australia as CEO in August, he also indicated that he would continue to remain involved with the NRL via broadcast negotiations. Abdo will move to Melbourne upon taking up his position as CEO of Tennis Australia. Abdo will leave the NRL on 15 July.

== Personal life ==
Abdo is married to Annalisa, Annalisa is the sister of South African golfer Ulrich van den Berg, his family has one daughter and one son. Abdo is a supporter of the Manly Warringah Sea Eagles. Abdo is interested in sports such as running, cycling, surfing and golf, he was also part of a social cricket team at Selborne College.

Preceded by Todd Greenberg	National Rugby League CEO; 2019–2026	Succeeded by Andrew Abdo
