= David Gallop =

Australian sports administrator (born 1964)

David Gallop AM
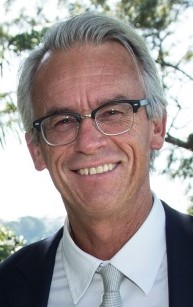
- Gallop in 2016
- Born: 6 August 1964 (age 62); Canberra, ACT, Australia
- Education: University of Sydney
- Occupations: CEO, FFA (2012–2019)
- Height: 188 cm (6 ft 2 in)
- Spouse: Kathy Gallop
- Children: 2

David Gallop is an Australian sports administrator, lawyer and served as the chief executive of the Football Federation Australia until December 2019. He previously served as the chief executive officer of the National Rugby League between February 2002 and June 2012. He was also the Secretary of the Rugby League International Federation from its inception in 1998 up until his resignation on 5 June 2012.

== Biography ==
Gallop was born in Canberra and lived there until the age of 14 while his father worked as a lawyer. He spent a short time in Darwin before returning to Canberra in the suburb of Narrabundah. Gallop played cricket at Canberra Grammar and his father persuaded him to become a Canberra Raiders supporter. He started a sports administration course at Canberra College of Advanced Education but bowed out after just a week for arts at the Australian National University. He then moved to Sydney in 1984 to study law at the University of Sydney, graduating in 1988. In 1989, he travelled to England to play cricket in the Kent League. In 1990, he married wife Katherine and together they have two children, Thomas and Anna.

=== Football administration ===
==== Rugby league ====
During the summer of 1994–95, Gallop was working as an associate with the Sydney law firm Holman Webb Lawyers, and playing cricket on weekends with a University of NSW Cricket Club side. A UNSW teammate had set up a meeting with John Ribot, who had come up with the Super League idea, and Gallop first became involved in Rugby league as Legal Affairs Manager for Super League in 1995.

Having previously acted as the NRL's Director of Legal and Business Affairs, Gallop was closely involved in all key decisions involving the game since the NRL's inception in late 1997. He was voted the New South Wales Sports Administrator of the Year in 2002. In 2006, he was voted the Australian Sports Administrator of the year at the Confederation of Australian Sport Awards.

In 2008, he was appointed to the Board of the Australian Sports Commission. In 2010, he was named acting Chairman of the Australian Sports Commission.

In April 2010, in one of the greatest sporting scandals in NRL history, he announced the stripping of two premierships and three minor premierships from the Melbourne Storm team. He further announced they would play out the remainder of the 2010 season for no points. Gallop was widely criticised by many for these heavy penalties with much of the criticism directed at the apparent conflict of interest. Gallop's employer - News Limited - was also the owner of the Melbourne Storm. Gallop was also close friends with John Hartigan - the then Chairman of News Limited Australia. Hartigan identified Storm's ex-CEO Brian Waldron as the 'chief rat'. This was the second major salary cap scandal under Gallop's leadership. In 2002, the then table-topping Canterbury Bulldogs were stripped of all competition points and finished wooden spooners after being found cheating the salary cap. However, just two years later they won the premiership with largely the same playing roster. Gallop also had to deal with the mid-season defection of Bulldogs star Sonny Bill Williams to French rugby union.

In February 2012, coinciding with the formation of the new NRL independent commission and the exit of News Limited from its control of the game, Gallop's contract as CEO was formally extended a further four years. His contract extension was a condition placed by News Limited with the ARL. 2012 was Gallop's 10th year in charge of Rugby League in Australia; however, on Tuesday, 5 June 2012 Gallop's reign as NRL CEO came to an end when the new Independent Commission announced his immediate departure. This was mostly due to the fact that the ARL wanted to go 'in a different direction'.

==== Soccer ====
On 21 August 2012, David Gallop was announced as the new chief executive of the Football Federation Australia, replacing previous CEO and former Australian rules footballer Ben Buckley. During his time as CEO, Gallop oversaw the introduction of the FFA Cup competition bringing together clubs from the national level A-League as well as state based leagues. In his time as CEO, Australia's men's and women's national teams also underwent substantial change, with Holger Osieck replaced as the men's team by Ange Postecoglou who took charge for the 2014 FIFA World Cup finals and Australia's successful appearance at the 2015 AFC Asian Cup. Australia's women's team coach Alen Stajcic was dismissed in the months leading up to the 2019 FIFA Women's World Cup, leading to some criticism in the media about his departure.

Gallop would prove an unpopular administrator at times within Australian soccer, with fan boycotts of A-League games reducing crowds by 32% in late 2015, protesting his decision to not defend the Australian football community after an article by News Corp journalist Rebecca Wilson leaked the identity of 198 supporters who had been banned from matches by the FFA, as well as a lack of a transparent appeals process for bans.

Gallop was appointed a Member of the Order of Australia in the 2016 Australia Day Honours.

In July 2019, it was announced that Gallop would stand down from his role as FFA CEO in December 2019.

Currently, Gallop holds a number of non-executive positions, including Venues NSW Chair, Step One Clothing Chair, Cricket NSW Director, Tabcorp Holdings Director, MOSH Chair and sports consultancy company, Alacria.

Preceded by David Moffett	National Rugby League CEO; 2002–2012	Succeeded by David Smith
