= Curtin University Malaysia =

University campus in Sarawak, Malaysia

Curtin University, Malaysia
- Universiti Curtin Malaysia (Malay)
- Curtin Emblem
- Motto: Make Tomorrow Better
- Type: Private
- Established: February 1999; 27 years ago
- Parent institution: Curtin University
- Affiliations: Australian Technology Network (ATN)
- Chancellor: David Lock
- Vice-Chancellor: Professor Harlene Hayne
- Pro Vice-Chancellor and President: Professor Vincent Lee Chieng Chen
- Students: 2,800 (2026)
- Location: CDT 250, Miri, Sarawak, 98009, Malaysia; 4°30′42″N 114°01′00″E
- Campus: 1,200 hectares (3,000 acres); Urban and parkland
- Colors: Gold Black
- Nickname: Carnabys
- Mascot: Carl the Carnaby
- Website: curtin.edu.my

Curtin University Malaysia is the Malaysian campus of Curtin University, a public university based in Australia. It is the university's largest campus outside of Australia with a total area of 1,200-hectare (3,000-acre) comprising academic and residential blocks. It offers undergraduate and postgraduate programs in various fields of commerce, engineering, computational sciences, humanities and health sciences. It also offers foundational courses and a Doctor of Philosophy (PhD) among other higher degree by research programs. It is named after John Curtin, a prominent Prime Minister of Australia during World War II from 1941 to 1945.

Curtin University, which has its main campus based in Perth, is the largest university in the state of Western Australia with 58,607 students globally in 2022. Students have options to transfer or study abroad to other Curtin campuses in Perth, Kalgoorlie, Singapore, Dubai and Mauritius as the same units are studied across its campuses. In additional, students from other universities and Curtin campuses can also apply to study abroad at Curtin Malaysia. As of 2022, the campus enrolled 1,937 students.

Under the "One Curtin" model, the campus is operated directly under Curtin University and degrees conferred by Curtin University to Curtin Malaysia students are equivalent to Curtin proper. The university follows the same academic calendar as Curtin Australia and uses the same curriculum, study materials and examinations. The university campus is accredited by the Malaysian Qualifications Agency (MQA) and tuition rates are significantly lower than of international students studying in its main campus in Perth. The university also conducts research at its Malaysian campus.

In Australia, the university is known for having high employer satisfaction rates. According to the 2022 Employer Satisfaction Survey published by the Australian Government's QILT, the university received the highest overall employer satisfaction (89.7%) among all universities in Australia. The university also ranks within the top 200 universities according to the Quacquarelli Symonds and U.S. News university ranking publications, while ranking somewhat lower on others.

== History ==
Curtin University is the modern descendent of the Perth Technical School, established in 1900, which later became the Western Australia Institute of Technology in 1966. The institution received university status in 1986 to form the Curtin University of Technology, named after paramount World War II Prime Minister of Australia John Curtin. In 2010, it removed the suffix from its name and became simply Curtin University. As of 2022, it is the largest university in the state of Western Australia with 58,607 students enrolled across its domestic and overseas campuses.

The Sarawak State Government invited Curtin University to establish an international campus in Sarawak, with both signing a Memorandum of Understanding in 1998. Professor Kevin McKenna became the inaugural Pro Vice-Chancellor and Chief Executive (President) of the newly-formed institution. Curtin Malaysia's operations in Miri commenced in February 1999, with initial study programs in various fields of engineering and commerce, with the campus fully opening by 2002.

On 11 May 2006, a ground breaking ceremony was held at the university for Phase 2 of its campus development and the Proposed Curtin Lake-View Eco-City. This expansion, masterplanned by Teo A. Khing Design Consultants (TAK) and supported by the Sarawak Government, Imasa Dinasti Sdn Bhd and the TAK Group of Companies, was part of a broader Greater Curtin Sarawak Development. Phase 2 of Curtin University Malaysia included the construction of new academic buildings and student facilities.

The university campus has students from more than 50 countries and teaching staff from more than 15 countries. Besides being the first offshore campus of Curtin University, it is also the first offshore campus by any overseas university set up in East Malaysia.

== Schools and departments ==
The courses offered by the Malaysia campus follows the identical structure and curriculum content as those offered at the main Bentley campus in Perth. During their course of studies, students have the discretion to study abroad or transfer to other Curtin campuses in Perth, Kalgoorlie, Singapore, Dubai and Mauritius to gain further international exposure and widen their perspectives. Curtin Malaysia also offers a range of university pathway programs alongside its undergraduate and postgraduate programs. Courses at Curtin Malaysia are currently provided by the following Curtin schools:

- Faculty of Business
- Faculty of Engineering and Science
- Faculty of Humanities and Health Sciences
- School of Pre-U and Continuing Education

The Curtin Malaysia Student Council is the main student body managing social events and clubs on the campus.

== Academic profile ==
University rankings

Global – Overall
- ARWU World: 201-300 (2024)
- CWTS World: 280 (Note: The CWTS Leiden Ranking is based on P(top 10%).) (2024)
- QS World: 174 (2025)
- QS Employability: 201-250 (2022)
- THE World: 251-300 (2025)
- USNWR Global: 164 (24/25)

Curtin University is a Western Australian university and perception of the university may differ across the different countries where it has campuses. In the 2024 Aggregate Ranking of Top Universities, which measures aggregate performance across the QS, THE and ARWU rankings, the university attained a position of #191 (11th nationally).

Ranking publications

In the 2025 Quacquarelli Symonds World University Rankings (published 2024), the university attained a position of #174.

In the Times Higher Education World University Rankings 2025 (published 2024), the university attained a position of #251-300.

In the 2024 Academic Ranking of World Universities, the university attained a position of #201-300.

In the 2024–2025 U.S. News & World Report Best Global Universities, the university attained a position of #164.

In the CWTS Leiden Ranking 2024, the university attained a position of #280.

== Notable people ==
- Mutang Tagal - Malaysian politician, lawyer and businessman who has served as 20th President of the Dewan Negara and Senator
- The Pro Vice-Chancellor and President of Curtin Malaysia is currently Professor Vincent Lee Chieng Chen.

== See also ==
- List of universities in Malaysia
