= Curtin Singapore =

University campus in Singapore

- Curtin Emblem
- Other names: Curtin Education Centre
- Motto: Look ever forward
- Type: Private
- Established: 13 November 2008; 17 years ago
- Parent institution: Curtin University
- Affiliations: Australian Technology Network (ATN)
- Chancellor: Vanessa Guthrie AO
- Vice-Chancellor: Harlene Hayne
- Pro Vice-Chancellor and President: Alex Stojcevski
- Students: 3,500 (2024)
- Location: 10 Science Park Road, The Alpha, Science Park II, Level 3, Unit 03-08, Singapore, 117684; 1°17′18″N 103°46′46″E
- Campus: Urban park
- Named after: John Curtin
- Colors: Gold Black
- Nickname: Carnabys
- Mascot: Carl the Carnaby
- Website: curtin.edu.sg

Curtin Singapore is the Singaporean campus of Curtin University, a public university in Australia. It offers undergraduate and postgraduate degree programs in healthcare, computational sciences, commerce and communications with plans to expand to science and engineering. The campus also offers a Doctor of Philosophy (PhD) higher degree by research program. Curtin University is named after John Curtin, a prominent Prime Minister of Australia during World War II from 1941 to 1945, and is the largest university in the state of Western Australia with 58,607 students globally in 2022.

Curtin's campuses follow the "One Curtin" model where all campuses follow identical course curriculum across its programs, including study material and examinations, as Curtin's main Bentley campus. This means that students have the option to transfer or study abroad to other Curtin campuses in Perth, Kalgoorlie, Malaysia, Dubai and Mauritius as units are generally identical. In additional, students from other universities and Curtin campuses can also apply to study abroad at Curtin Singapore. In 2022, the university shifted from its original campus in Whampoa to The Alpha building in Singapore's Science Park II in Queenstown, near NUS and the National University Hospital.

Curtin Singapore is operated directly under Curtin University, which is generally not the case for most private education providers in Singapore. This means that study programs are provided directly by Curtin University and not an external provider. While Curtin Singapore graduates generally have higher employment rates than other private universities in Singapore, it is still lower than public institutions such as the National University of Singapore and Nanyang Technological University. The university follows a trimester model, allowing students to complete a bachelors program in 2 years.

In Australia, the university is known for having high employer satisfaction rates. According to the 2022 Employer Satisfaction Survey published by the Australian Government's QILT, the university received the highest overall employer satisfaction (89.7%) among all universities in Australia. The university also ranks within the top 200 universities according to the Quacquarelli Symonds and U.S. News university ranking publications, while ranking somewhat lower on others.

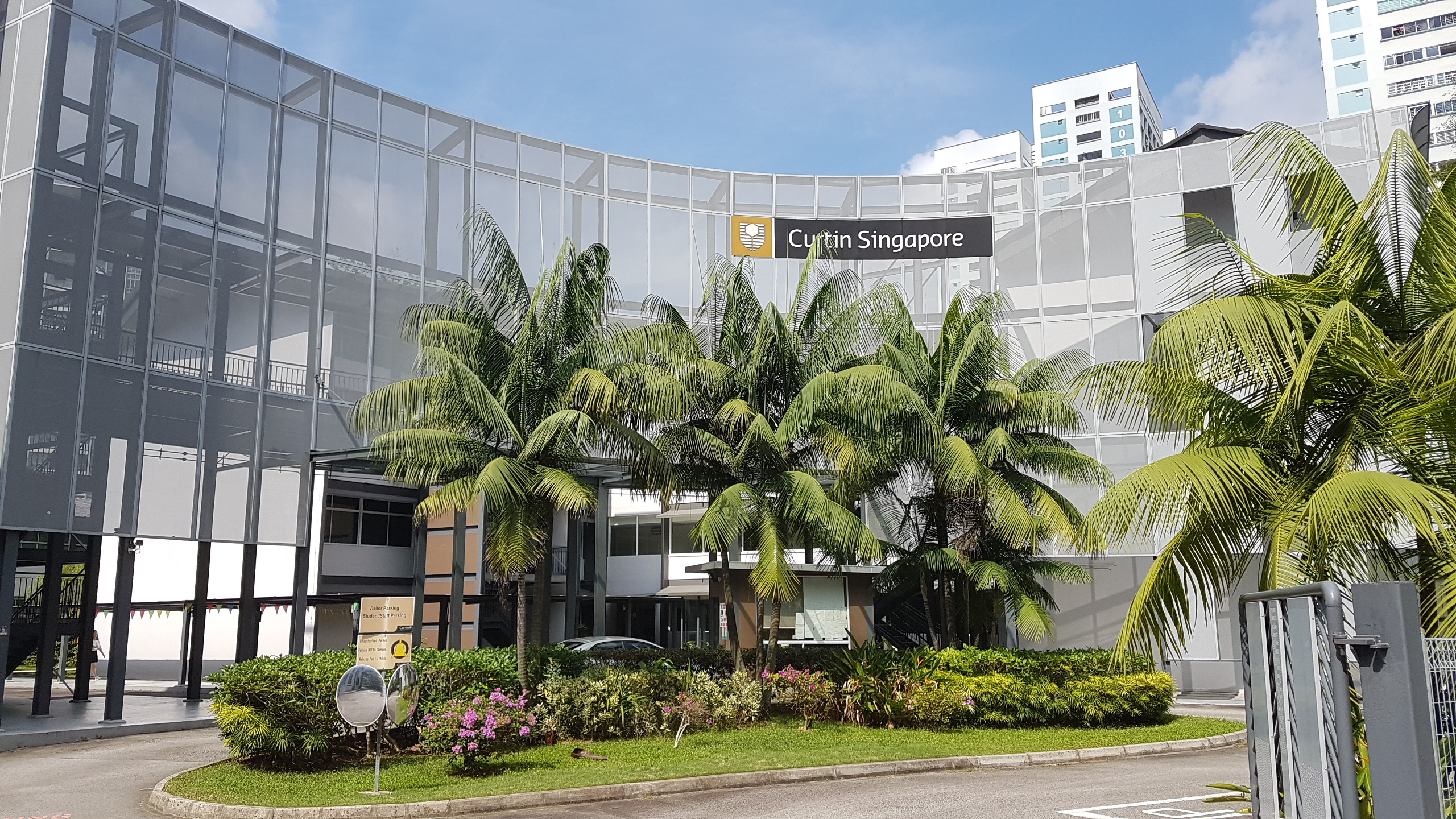
Front entrance of the original campus in Whampoa, Singapore

== History ==
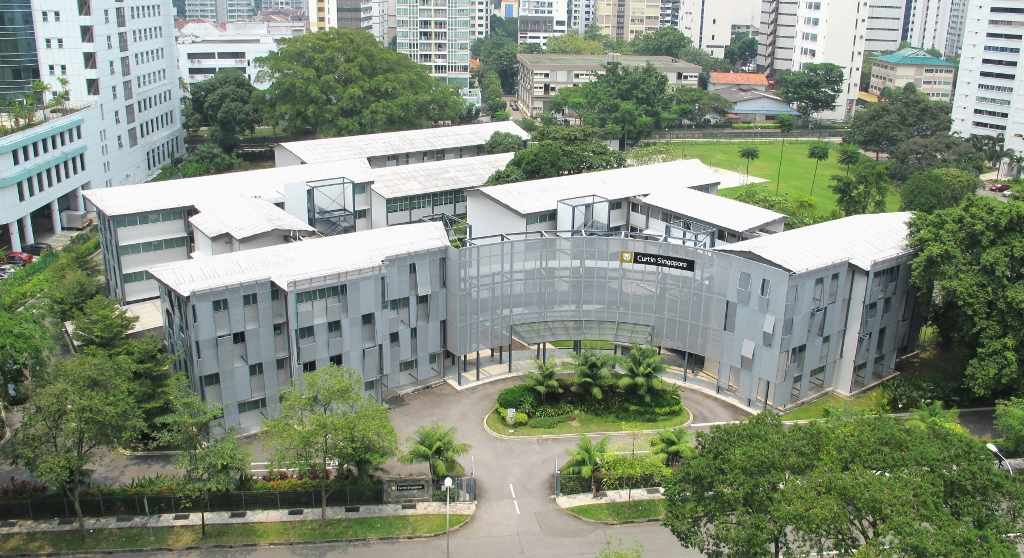
Aerial shot of the original campus

Curtin University is the modern descendent of the Perth Technical School, established in 1900, which later became the Western Australia Institute of Technology in 1966. The institution received university status in 1986 to form the Curtin University of Technology, named after paramount World War II Prime Minister of Australia John Curtin. In 2010, it removed the suffix from its name and became simply Curtin University. As of 2022, it is the largest university in the state of Western Australia with 58,607 students enrolled across its domestic and overseas campuses.

Curtin University has been actively present in Singapore since 1986 through the establishment of links with private educational providers in Singapore, including the Singapore Human Resource Institute, Marketing Institute of Singapore and the Singapore Institute of Materials Management. Prior to the establishment of its full-fledged independent campus in Singapore, degrees from Curtin were originally awarded through these partners.

The opening of Curtin Singapore's 5,600-square-metre (60,000 sq ft) campus at Jalan Rajah in Whampoa allowed the university to be able to provide courses on its own merit. All Curtin University courses since its founding has been delivered directly by the university and units are the same across campuses. Students at the Singapore campus are awarded the same degree and transcripts as their peers at other Curtin campuses. The overall cost to establish the university in 2008 was S$40 million.

Curtin Singapore's operations began in December 2008 with an initial enrolment of 900 students, including new and continuing students who were enrolled in Curtin's previous partners. Curtin Singapore had 2,081 students in 2022, an increase of 23% from the previous year.

== Location and facilities ==
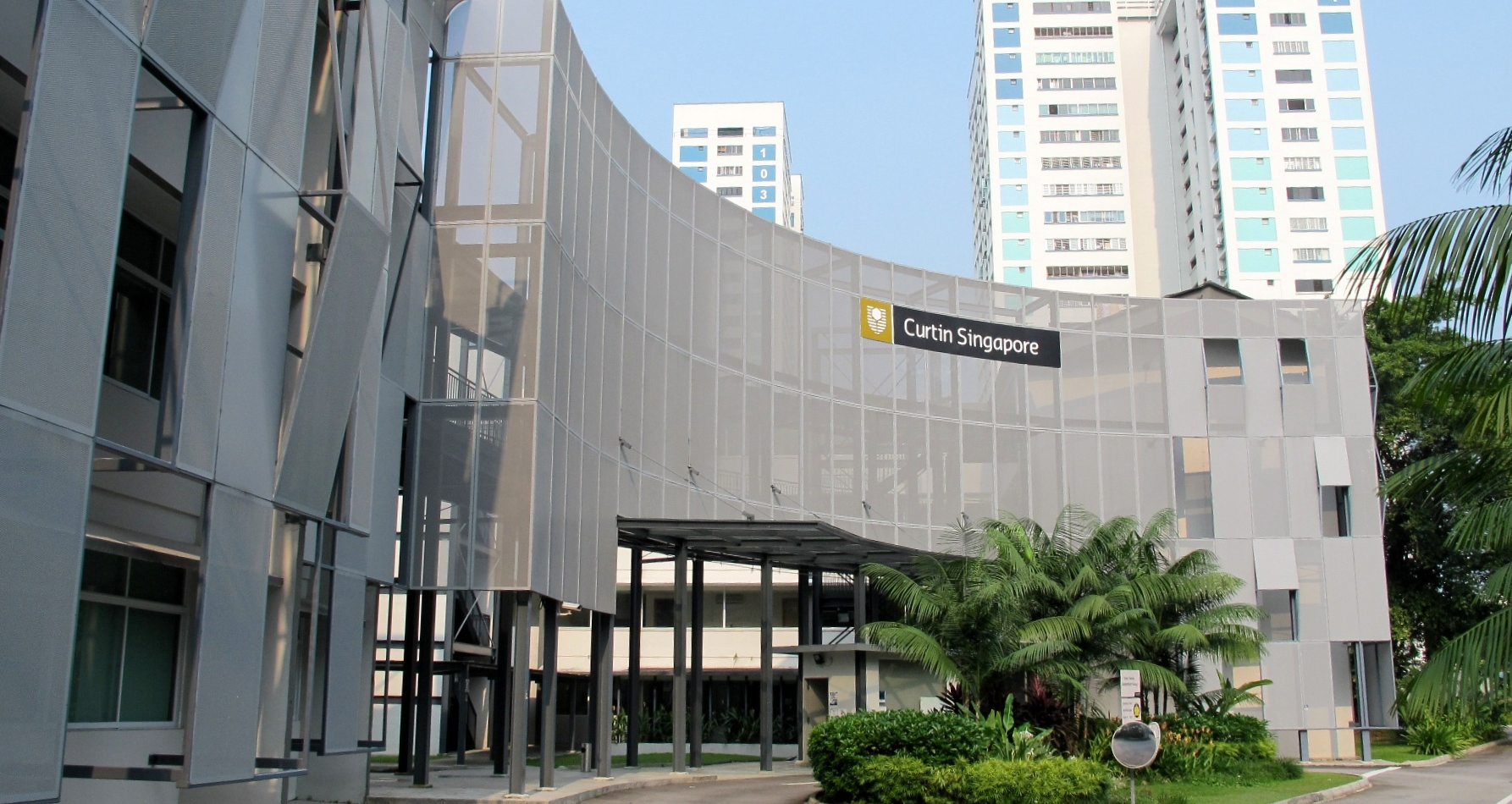
Facade of the original campus

Curtin Singapore's first campus was located at 90 and 92 Jalan Rajah in Whampoa and was officially opened on 13 November 2008 by S. Iswaran, Singapore's Senior Minister of State at the Ministry of Trade and Industry, and Doug Chester, the Australian High Commissioner to Singapore. Some facilities at the previous location included a student lounge, library, computer labs, canteen, dining areas, basketball court and gym.

In 2022, Curtin Singapore moved onto levels 1 through to 4 of the Alpha building in Singapore Science Park 2. Co-located with industry within the science park precinct, Curtin Singapore is a 15-minute walk from Haw Par Villa MRT station and is closer to NUS, the National University Hospital and the Greater Southern Waterfront. Along with the new campus, the campus announced plans for future expansion to provide courses in the sciences, engineering, business administration and majors in computing.

Facilities at the new Curtin Singapore campus at the Alpha are spread over 4 levels of the building. Level 2 includes a library, clinical labs and gym. The library offers Group Discussion Pods, Individual Pods, printing services, Macintosh computers, charging ports and study desks. The clinical lab has equipment and tools to simulate hospital and clinical environments. Level 3 includes a student lounge and computer labs. The student lounge has a pantry for students, vending machines, microwaves, pool tables, charging ports and conference seminar rooms. Level 4 has various group discussion tables and computers for students to access their student portal. Additional facilities as part of the wider science park include an outdoor gym, barbecue pits and a swimming pool.

== Schools and departments ==
The courses offered by the Singapore campus follows the identical structure and curriculum content as those offered at the main Bentley campus in Perth. During their course of studies, students have the discretion to study abroad or transfer to other Curtin campuses in Perth, Kalgoorlie, Malaysia, Dubai and Mauritius to gain further international exposure and widen their perspectives. Curtin Singapore also offers a range of Curtin College pathway programs alongside its Curtin University undergraduate and postgraduate programs. Courses at Curtin Singapore are currently provided by the following Curtin schools:

- Faculty of Business and Law
  - Curtin Business School
- Faculty of Health Sciences
  - Curtin School of Nursing
- Faculty of Humanities
  - School of Media, Creative Arts and Social Inquiry
- Faculty of Science and Engineering
  - School of Electrical Engineering, Computing and Mathematical Sciences

The Curtin Singapore Student Committee (STUCO) is the main student body managing social events and clubs on the campus.

== Academic profile ==
University rankings

Global – Overall
- ARWU World: 201-300 (2024)
- CWTS World: 280 (Note: The CWTS Leiden Ranking is based on P(top 10%).) (2024)
- QS World: 174 (2025)
- QS Employability: 201-250 (2022)
- THE World: 251-300 (2025)
- USNWR Global: 164 (24/25)

Curtin University is a Western Australian university and perception of the university may differ across the different countries where it has campuses. In the 2024 Aggregate Ranking of Top Universities, which measures aggregate performance across the QS, THE and ARWU rankings, the university attained a position of #191 (11th nationally).

Ranking publications

In the 2025 Quacquarelli Symonds World University Rankings (published 2024), the university attained a position of #174.

In the Times Higher Education World University Rankings 2025 (published 2024), the university attained a position of #251-300.

In the 2024 Academic Ranking of World Universities, the university attained a position of #201-300.

In the 2024–2025 U.S. News & World Report Best Global Universities, the university attained a position of #164.

In the CWTS Leiden Ranking 2024, the university attained a position of #280.

== Entry requirements ==
Curtin programs have academic entry requirements that vary based on the level and field of studies. In addition, Curtin Singapore offers Curtin College pathway diploma programs that offer entry into various undergraduate programs with or without advanced standing.

=== Undergraduate ===
For undergraduate courses, Curtin's academic entry requirement is a high school certificate at level 12 or equivalent or a diploma from a polytechnic or other recognised institution. Students are also required to have attained Curtin's English language pre-requisite. Students not meeting the entry requirements for undergraduate programs can apply for pathway diploma programs.

=== Postgraduate ===
For postgraduate courses, Curtin academic entry requirement is an undergraduate or bachelor's degree acceptable by Curtin's standards. Students are also required to have attained Curtin's English language pre-requisite along with other criteria depending on the field of study. Doctoral program applicants are also required to have a Bachelor Honours or other post-graduate qualification.

== Notable people ==
Notable alumni of Curtin University's Singapore campus include:

- Nguyễn Phương Khánh - Vietnamese model and beauty queen and first Vietnamese woman to win the Miss Earth title in 2018
- Sheila Sim - Singaporean actress, model and businesswoman
- Antonio Blanco Jr. - Indonesian actor and model
