= PDIC =

PDIC may refer to:

- Professional Diving Instructors Corporation
- Plymouth Devon International College
- Philippine Deposit Insurance Corporation
- Public Demands Implementation Convention a political party from Meghalaya, India active from 1977 to 1997
