= Edith Cowan (disambiguation) =

Edith Dircksey Brown Cowan (1861–1932) was an Australian social reformer.

Edith Cowan may also refer to:

- Edith Cowan University, Perth, Western Australia, Australia
- Edith Cowan College, Perth, Western Australia, Australia; formerly Perth Institute of Business and Technology
- Edith Dircksey Cowan Memorial, Kings Park, Perth, Western Australia, Australia

== See also ==
- Cowan (disambiguation)
- Edith
