= Robert Duffield =

Robert Duffield may refer to:

- Robert Duffield (journalist) (1935–2000), Australian journalist
- Robert B. Duffield (1917–2000), American radiochemist
