= Navitas Limited =

Australian education services company

Navitas Pty Ltd
- Logo since 2007
- Trade name: Navitas
- Formerly: IBT Education Pty Ltd
- Company type: Private
- ISIN: AU000000NVT2
- Industry: Education services
- Founded: 1994 in Perth, Australia
- Founders: Rod Jones (Chairman); Dr Peter Larsen
- Headquarters: Level 8 Brookfield Place, 125 St Georges Terrace, Perth, WA, Australia
- Number of locations: over 120 (2017)
- Areas served: Australia; New Zealand; United Kingdom; United States; Canada; Netherlands; United Arab Emirates; Southeast Asia; Sri Lanka; South Africa
- Key people: Scott Jones (CEO); Colin Pavlovich (CFO); Ben Gray (Director); Terence Bowen (Director)
- Services: University pathways; English language training; Tertiary education
- Revenue: ▼AU$943,356,000 (2020); AU$958,671,000 (2019)
- Net income: ▼AU$-53,234,000 (2020); AU$81,226,000 (2019)
- Total assets: ▲AU$1,022,931,000 (2020); AU$874,625,000 (2019)
- Number of employees: 6,046 (2020)
- Parent: BGH Capital
- Subsidiaries: SAE Institute; Navitas English; Australian College of Applied Psychology (ACAP); Navitas Professional; Australian School of Applied Management (ASAM)
- Website: www.navitas.com

Navitas (also known as Navitas Limited, previously known as IBT Education) is an Australian owned for-profit private education services company, owning various private education providers internationally. It is the largest private non-university higher education provider in Australia.

Navitas made A$929.69 million in total sales in 2018, through its various subsidiaries and pathways programs in association with 11 public universities in Australia.

== History ==
Navitas was established in 1994, as the Perth Institute of Business and Technology (PIBT). The company was co-founded by Rod Jones and Dr Peter Larsen, as a joint venture with Edith Cowan University. Both founders had career backgrounds in education and education administration, and recognised a gap in the tertiary education sector, where international students, despite being equally capable as domestic students, were failing their courses due to lack of support. Following a partnership deal with a university in the United Kingdom in 2000, the company made its first international expansion. Four years onward, following success in this venture and the further establishment of pathways colleges, the company was listed publicly on the Australian Securities Exchange as IBT Education, being the first Australian education company to do so.

In 2005, as Australia's only private education company of its kind at the time, IBT Education acquired the largest private English language teaching (ELT) company in Australia, Australian Centre for Languages (ACL) Pty Ltd. for A$55.7m. Following shareholder approval, the company proceeded with a renaming in 2007, renaming itself from IBT Education Limited, to Navitas Limited, as well as rebranding its public operations to Navitas. Navitas expanded operations into the USA in 2010, through partnerships with the University of Massachusetts and Western Kentucky University. Responding to a favourable financial environment, Navitas moved on acquiring SAE Group, for A$294.3m, in 2011, its largest acquisition so far. Following further success, propelled by the growing international education industry, in 2014, Navitas entered the ASX 100. Subsequently, Forbes placed it 25th in their Most Innovative Growth Companies 2014 list. In 2017, the company launched Navitas Ventures, a corporate venture capital fund.

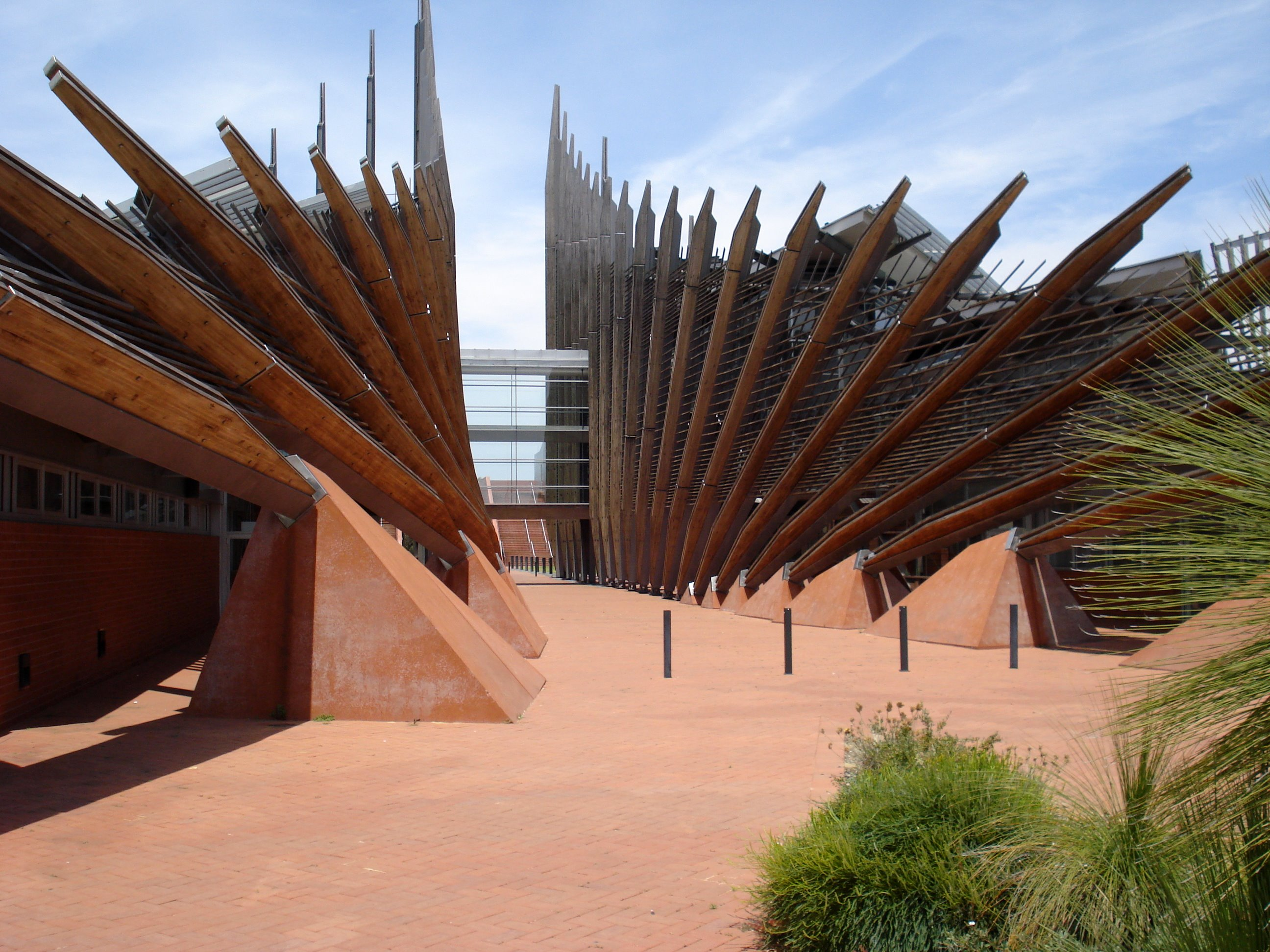
Navitas' first partner, Edith Cowan University

=== Private equity takeover ===
In 2019, Navitas agreed to a buyout from a consortium of investors, following negotiation throughout 2018 and 2019, where Navitas rejected the initial offer. Following this, the shareholders were informed of the terms of the buyout, at A$5.825 per share (A$2.3 billion total). The investor consortium was led by private equity firm BGH Capital, also consisting of AustralianSuper and the company's founder Rod Jones. This marked the largest-ever acquisition by an Australian private equity firm, by gross value.

== Structure ==
As of 2019, the ultimate parent of Navitas Limited is BGH Capital.

=== Segments ===
The company's subsidiary businesses are categorised under two segments; careers and industry, and university pathways partnerships. These categorisations are used to describe its revenue sources.

Navitas Organisational Structure

BGH Capital

Navitas

University Partnerships

Navitas Ventures

Careers and Industry

Corporate Functions

- SAE Institute

==== Careers and industry ====
These companies explicitly provide career and industry training to students:

- Navitas English
- Navitas Professional
- SAE Creative Media Institute
- Australian College of Applied Psychology (ACAP)
- Australian School of Applied Management (ASAM)

==== University pathways partnerships ====
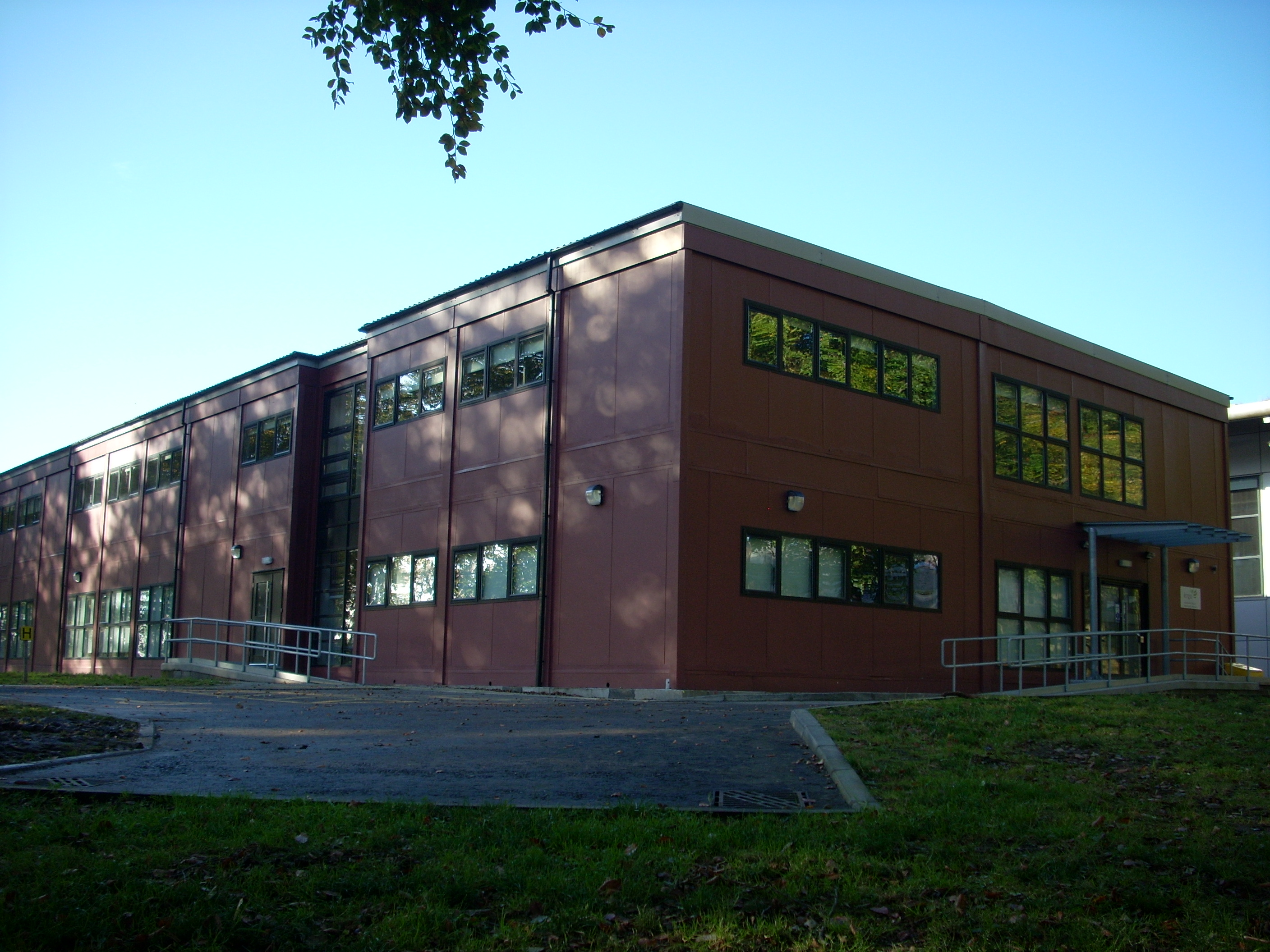
International College Robert Gordon University building in Aberdeen, United Kingdom.

These partnerships are between universities and Navitas, establishing separate pathways colleges, with the university branding for students who would otherwise not meet entry requirements to the university.

Navitas Subsidiary	Pathway for	City	Country
Curtin College	Curtin University	Perth	Australia
Curtin Singapore	Curtin University	Singapore	Singapore
Deakin College	Deakin University	Melbourne	Australia
Edith Cowan College	Edith Cowan University	Perth	Australia
Eynesbury College	University of Adelaide, University of South Australia	Adelaide	Australia
Griffith College	Griffith University	Brisbane	Australia
La Trobe College	La Trobe University	Melbourne	Australia
South Australian Institute of Business and Technology	University of South Australia	Adelaide	Australia
Sydney Institute of Business and Technology	Western Sydney University	Sydney	Australia
Taylors College	The University of Sydney	Sydney	Australia
University of Canterbury International College	University of Canterbury	Christchurch	New Zealand
University of Canberra College	University of Canberra	Canberra	Australia
Western Sydney University International College	Western Sydney University	Sydney	Australia
ARU College	Anglia Ruskin University	Cambridge	United Kingdom
Birmingham City University International College	Birmingham City University	Birmingham	United Kingdom
Hertfordshire International College	University of Hertfordshire	Hertfordshire	United Kingdom
International College at Robert Gordon University	Robert Gordon University	Aberdeen	United Kingdom
International College Portsmouth	University of Portsmouth	Portsmouth	United Kingdom
Leicester University Global Study Centre	University of Leicester	Leicester	United Kingdom
London Brunel International College	Brunel University London	London	United Kingdom
The College, Swansea University	Swansea University	Swansea	United Kingdom
The Hague Pathway College	The Hague University of Applied Sciences	The Hague	Netherlands
Twente Pathway College	University of Twente	Enschede	Netherlands
University of Northampton International College	University of Northampton	Northampton	United Kingdom
UA92 Global	Lancaster University	Manchester	United Kingdom
University of Plymouth International College	University of Plymouth	Plymouth	United Kingdom
Fraser International College	Simon Fraser University	Burnaby	Canada
International College of Manitoba	University of Manitoba	Manitoba	Canada
Richard Bland College of William and Mary Global Student Success Program	William & Mary, University of Virginia, Virginia Tech	Virginia	United States
Toronto Metropolitan University International College	Toronto Metropolitan University	Toronto	Canada
Umass Boston Navitas Global Student Success Program	UMass Boston	Boston	United States
Queens College Global Student Success Program	Queens College	New York City	United States
Wilfirid Laurier International College	Wilfrid Laurier University	Brantford	Canada
Australian College of Technology and Business	Edith Cowan University	Colombo	Sri Lanka
Murdoch University Dubai	Murdoch University	Dubai	United Arab Emirates

=== Navitas Ventures ===
In 2017, Navitas launched its venture capital fund, Navitas Ventures, aimed at startups in the educational technology (EdTech) sector.

==== Portfolio ====
As of 2021, the Navitas Ventures portfolio contains nine companies:

- Paragon One
- InsideSherpa
- StudyLink
- Australian School of Applied Management
- National Excellence in School Leadership Initiative
- Women & Leadership Australia
- PAT Inc
- Become
- Acadeum

== Revenue ==
Navitas Pty Ltd Revenue in 2018.
1. University Partnerships (64.4%)
2. Careers and Industry (34.2%)
3. Corporate Functions (1.40%)

The company derives revenue from areas which are categorised into three segments, defined by the company structure.

=== University partnerships ===
This segment encapsulates pathways programs run by Navitas in partnership with other universities.

University partnerships account for the largest part of Navitas revenue, and was their original revenue source.

=== Careers and industry ===
This segment includes all career and industry training institutions, such as SAE Institute and Professional & English Programs (PEP). The careers and industry section of the business is a result of Navitas' acquisition of training institutions, such as Australian College of Applied Psychology, SAE Institute, and Australian School of Applied Management. The segment also includes student recruitment services, which provides recruitment services to students such as internships, for those seeking experience internationally.

Prior to 2017, this segment was represented as 2 smaller categories, Professional and English Programs (PEP) and SAE Institute, however was merged.

=== Corporate ===
This segment includes Navitas group's corporate functions.

=== Yearly results (2006–2018) ===
This table displays the total revenue divided by each segment, before interest, taxes, depreciation, amortisation and impairment.

All dollar figures in this table are in Australian Dollars (AUD), in thousands.

Year	University Partnerships	Careers and Industry	Corporate Functions	Total
2018	▲$598,887	▼$317,563	▲$13,243	▼$929,693
2017	▼$574,129	▲$375,054	▼$4,321	▼$953,504
2016	▲$635,411	▼$368,440	▲$4,584	▲$1,008,435
2015	▲$566,340	▲$409,459	▲$2,432	▲$978,141
2014	▲$499,186	▲$374,532	▼$2,255	▲$875,973
2013	▲$415,713	▼$311,311	▼$2,537	▲$729,561
2012	▼$366,674	▲$317,975	▼$3,497	▲$688,146
2011	▲$372,947	▲$265,152	▲$3,727	▲$641,826
2010	▲$346,755	▲$205,070	▲$3,569	▲$555,394
2009	▲$283,419	▲$183,773	▲$2,644	▲$469,836
2008	▲$209,138	▲$132,843	▼$1,171	▲$343,152
2007	▲$155,929	▲$125,129	▼$1,652	▲$282,710
2006	$137,178	$85,475	$3,393	$226,046

== Leadership ==
=== Rod Jones, CEO from 1994–2018 ===
Rod Jones co-founded the company, Initially working in government and university administration. With experience in the industry, and an interest in capitalising on the rapidly growing student market, the founder found initial success upon the company's inception. Rod Jones remained CEO of the company through its expansion, until it was re-privatised by the consortium run by BGH Capital. He was then succeeded by David Buckingham.

=== David Buckingham, CEO from 2018–2019 ===
On 27th Feb 2018, the board announced that David Buckingham will succeed Rod Jones as CEO after 23 years of service. David Buckingham worked for Navitas since 2016, and was previously CEO of iiNet, an Australian telecommunications provider.

=== Scott Jones, CEO from 2019–present ===
Following the BGH Capital takeover, Scott Jones was appointed CEO in 2019. Scott Jones had worked within Navitas group since 2008, working as CEO for SAE Global, then CEO for Navitas Careers and Industry Division.

== Criticism ==
=== Industry criticisms ===
For-profit private education has come under scrutiny in many industry journal reports, with Navitas, as Australia's biggest provider in the industry, commonly the subject of discussion.

It is suggested by scholars that for-profit private education has several pitfalls. The for-profit model is said to compromise the quality of education, in favour of financial profit. However, the sector provides a pivotal part in many disadvantaged students lives, to provide a second chance, to those who did not have access to traditional tertiary education pathways.

The rapid growth of the private higher education (PHE) industry has been linked in many countries to employers’ changing workforce demands, to preferring workers who can quickly react to technological advancements. In Australia, the cause of this growth has been linked to the inability of the public education sector to accommodate the growing demand of international students.

The foundation of TEQSA in 2011 and subsequent funding towards public tertiary education providers, has further contributed to Navitas and the PHE industry's ability to grow in Australia.

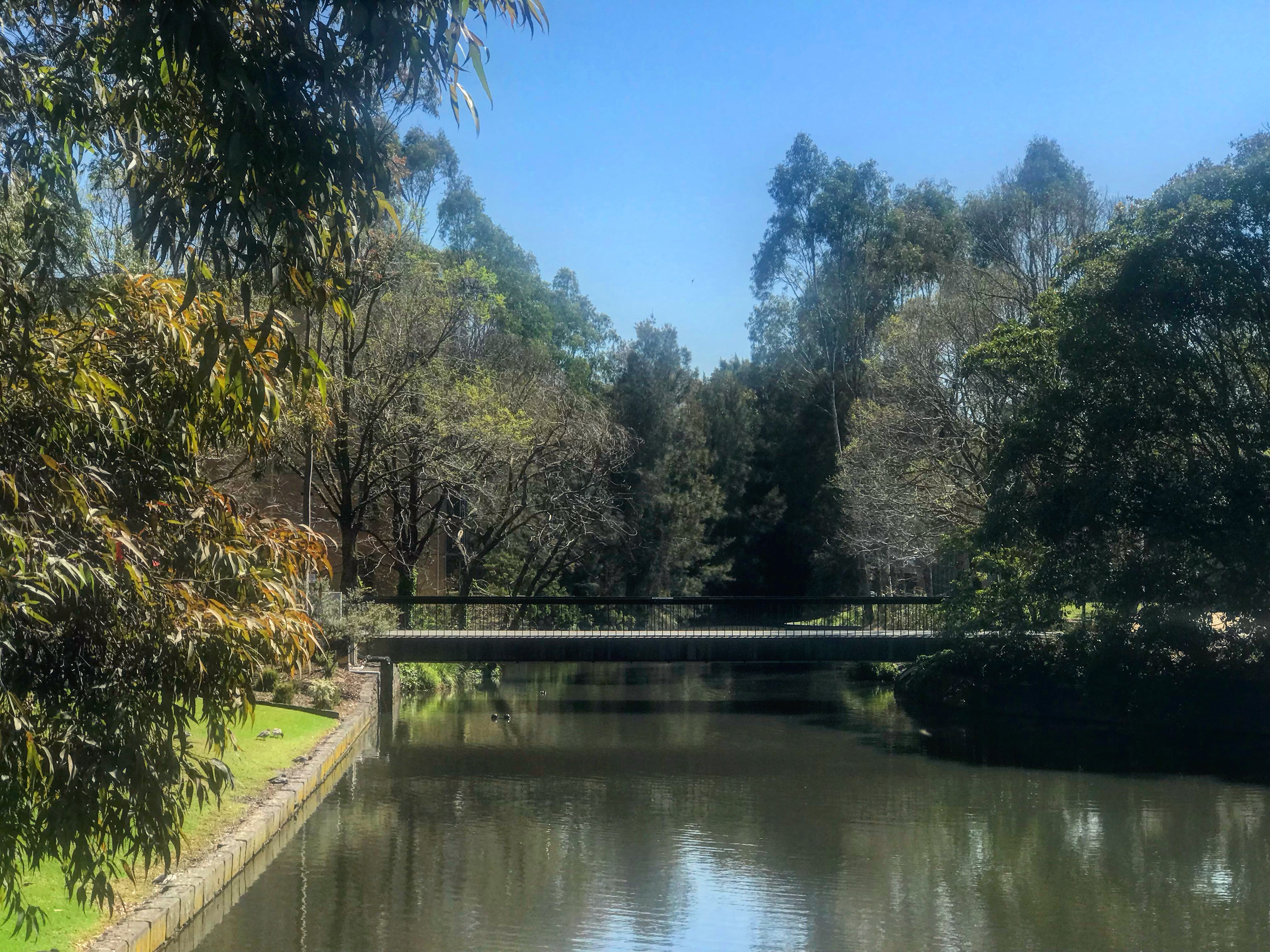
La Trobe Melbourne Campus

=== La Trobe Melbourne ===
Between April and June 2014, staff at Navitas owned La Trobe Melbourne partook in various strikes. This industrial action was in response to unreasonable negotiation of employment in regards to working conditions, job cuts and job security, between Navitas and the National Tertiary Education Union (NTEU).

The working conditions being contested were the employer's usage of hot-desking and lack of staff space such as lockers. The job security concerns were in regards to more than 60 percent of the university's teaching staff being employed by casual contracts. In response to the strike, the university chancellor refused an open dialogue with the Union, and proceeded with the 350 job cuts.

Following the job cuts, the National Tertiary Education Union submitted an enquiry with the Fair Work Commission, requesting that the Commission assess their dispute with the La Trobe Melbourne (Navitas) enterprise bargaining agreement (EBA). The dispute details the NTEU's belief that Navitas had failed assess its need for casual staff, in the case that many staff employed casually should actually be under fixed-term or on-going contracts, as stated in the EBA. This type of employment is known as sham contracting. The Fair Work Commission expressed that it was not satisfied with Navitas' obligation to assess their casual employment contract validity. The Commission stated that all casual contracts must be re-assessed, and that Navitas must expedite this process, and work with NTEU to fulfil their obligation within the EBA.

== See also ==
- SAE Institute
