= Siti Rozaimeriyanty =

Bruneian architect and politician (born 1974)

Siti Rozaimeriyanty PSB PIKB
- سيتي روزايمريينتي
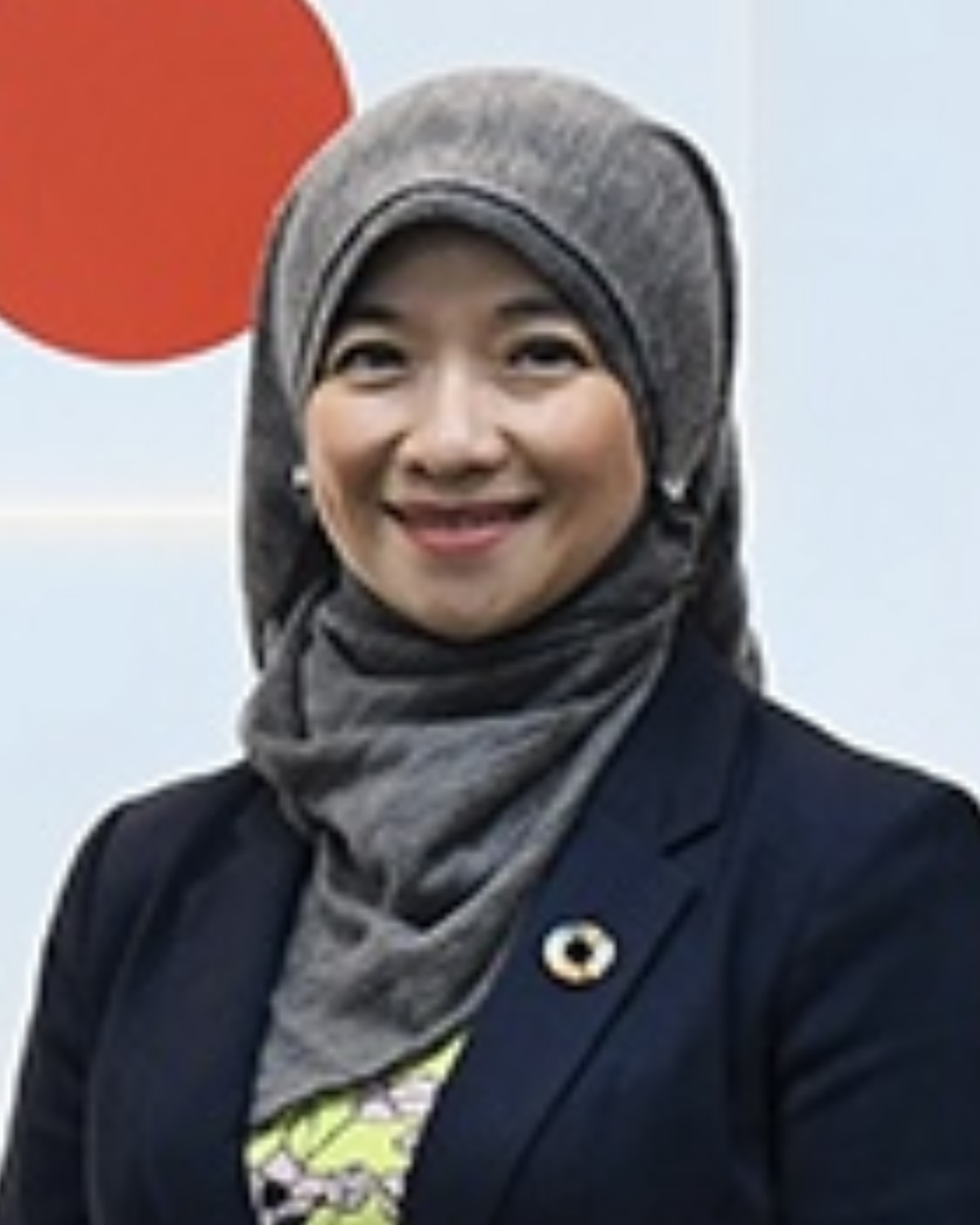
- Siti Rozaimeriyanty in 2023

Member of the Legislative Council
- In office 13 January 2017 – 6 March 2022

Personal details
- Born: Siti Rozaimeriyanty binti Abdul Rahman; 5 March 1974 (age 52) Brunei
- Education: Curtin University (BArch); Humberside University (BA)
- Occupation: Politician; architect

Siti Rozaimeriyanty binti Haji Abdul Rahman (born 5 March 1974), sometimes referred to as Yanty Rahman, is a Bruneian architect and politician who was previously appointed as a member of Brunei's Legislative Council (LegCo) from 2017 to 2022. Notably, she is the Deputy President and Chairman of the Pertubuhan Ukur Jurutera dan Arkitek (PUJA), as well as a member of the ASEAN Architects Committee (Brunei), Darussalam Enterprise (DARe), APEQS, ASEAN Business Advisory Council (ASEAN-BAC), and East Asia Business Council's board of directors. Her areas of interest and experience are in construction and general business, with an emphasis on finding better and more varied ways to realize Brunei Vision 2035.

== Early life and education ==
Siti Rozaimeriyanty was born on 5 March 1974 in Brunei. She graduated with a Bachelor of Arts (Hons) in Architecture from Humberside University in the United Kingdom and a Bachelor of Architecture (Hons) from Curtin University of Technology in Perth, Australia.

== Architectural career ==
Siti Rozaimeriyanty is a registered practicing architect with the UK and ASEAN Architects, BAPEQS, and RIBA as a chartered architect. She has worked for fifteen years as a senior architect in Brunei's Ministry of Development's Public Works Department before founding Eco Bumi Arkitek (EBA). For the years 2018 to 2019, she will serve as the first female president of the PUJA Brunei (Institute of Surveyor, Engineer, and Architect).

When EBA was founded in 2010, it was one of the few architectural firms with a chief architect who was female. EBA's mission statement is to practice an integrated, multidisciplinary design process with a client-inclusive approach. The company began with a small team of employees and has since grown to include 28 local and foreign employees. It works on several projects involving both local and foreign partners.

To guarantee that Brunei's trainee engineers have access to top-notch professional development, the Institution of Civil Engineers has renewed a training program and signed an agreement of collaboration with Siti Rozaimeriyanty and Patrick Courtney exchanged the agreement in 2019.

== Political career ==
On 13 January 2017, Siti Rozaimeriyanty was named as a LegCo Member in the "Among the Persons Who Have Achieved Distinctions" category, ten years after EBA was founded. She brought up subjects, especially those pertaining to women and economic growth as well as education, skills, and development. She questioned whether plans have been implemented by the relevant authorities to improve the efficiency of data.gov.bn or if a new database center will function as a one-stop shop with all the necessary crucial information on the third day of the 15th LegCo session.

The Brunei Economic Development Board from 2020 to 2023, the AITI (Authority for Info-communications Technology Industry) from 2018 to 2023, the ASEAN Business Advisory Council, and the East Asia Business Advisory Council from 2016 to 2021 are just a few of the organisations she has been appointed to the board of. Additionally, she co-chairs the Manpower Planning and Employment Council's (MPEC) Manpower Industry Steering Committee (MISC) for Construction.

In order to fully utilise the potential of both areas, Siti Rozaimeriyanty expresses support for the ASEAN-BAC in the reopening of ASEAN-EU free trade talks between the two blocs and welcomes additional cooperation in developing ASEAN-EU relations. During the 43rd General Assembly of ASEAN, which was held recently in Phnom Penh, Cambodia, she was formally appointed as the ASEAN Inter-Parliamentary Assembly (AIPA)'s Secretary General. "ASEAN's role, with AIPA's support, is to bring people together and provide platforms for them to grow their ideas while reinforcing legislative measures," she emphasised. On 7 February 2023, Secretary-General Kao Kim Hourn had a visit from her at the ASEAN Secretariat.

== Awards and honours ==
Siti Rozaimeriyanty's accomplishments include serving as lead consultant for the design of the Moments and Momentos Museum at the Prime Minister's Office, local associate architect for Balai Pameran Islam Sultan Haji Hassanal Bolkiah (in collaboration with the renowned PEI Architects from New York), and lead architect and project manager for Abode Resort & Spa, Brunei's first solar-powered luxury resort. In honour of her accomplishments, she has been shortlisted to win the Leadership Legacy Award in the Architecture & Design Sector from the International Business Review ASEAN Awards 2022.

Throughout her career, she has received the following:

- Malaysia-China Chamber of Commerce Golden Green Award (2011)
- Certificate of Doctor Fellow of the Royal Institute of Architects (2019)
- Order of Setia Negara Brunei Fourth Class (PSB)
- Excellent Service Medal (PIKB)
