= Murdoch University Dubai =

Branch university campus in Dubai, United Arab Emirates

Murdoch University Dubai جامعة مردوك دبي
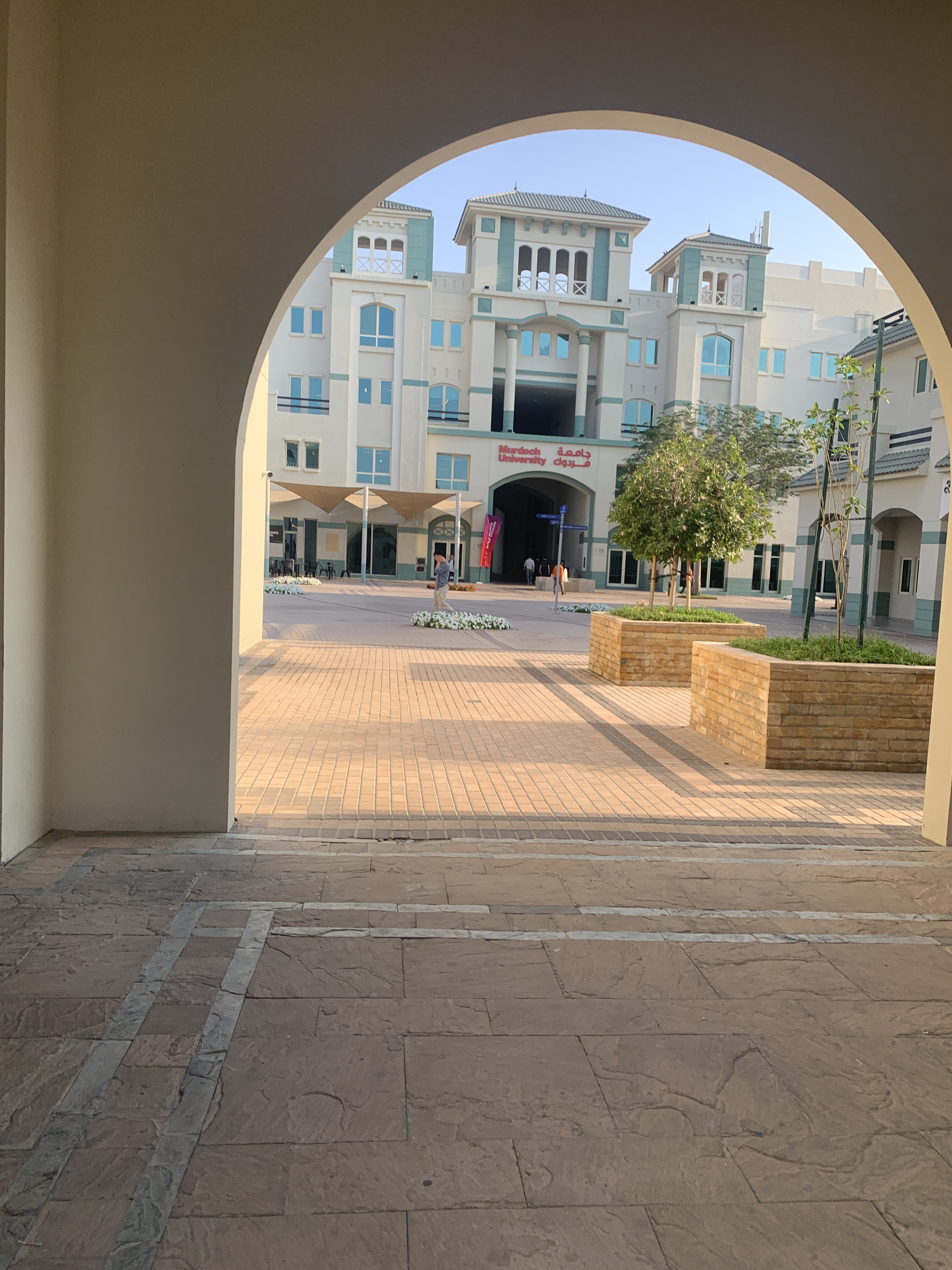
- Murdoch University Dubai from behind
- Type: Private
- Established: 2008
- Affiliations: Navitas; TEQSA, Australia; KHDA, Dubai
- Location: Dubai Knowledge Park, Dubai, United Arab Emirates
- Website: murdochuniversitydubai.com

Murdoch University Dubai is an Australian university campus located in Dubai Knowledge Park, in Dubai in the United Arab Emirates; it is a branch campus of Murdoch University in Perth, Western Australia.

Murdoch University Dubai was inaugurated in Dubai International Academic City in 2008 by Nahyan bin Mubarak Al Nahyan, the UAE Minister of Higher Education and Scientific Research. The campus was extended to 27,000 square feet, double its original size, in 2020. The new campus, which opened in July 2020, was designed by Woods Bagot, and constructed by KPS. It is intended to support expanded facilities in Artificial Intelligence and cybersecurity. The completed multi-million dollar campus sat empty for a period because of restrictions related to the COVID-19 pandemic, in a period where new admissions for institutions across Dubai fell by 50%. The university established a hardship fund for students impacted by the pandemic.

The university is a joint-venture between Murdoch University and the Navitas Middle East.

During the 2020 COVID-19 pandemic, the university was involved in a collaborative project with Khalifa University investigating how the novel coronavirus was able to be transmitted from animals, such as bats, to humans.

Murdoch Dubai offers foundation, diploma, undergraduate and postgraduate degrees in business, IT, Communications, Psychology and Education. It is an Amazon Web Services Academy member institution and recognised by the Dubai Knowledge and Human Development Authority as achieving both a five star employability rating and a 91.1% satisfaction rate for teaching and learning. Murdoch Dubai has been cited as one of the 16 best-known UAE universities in 2020.

The present Dean of Murdoch Dubai was previously Deputy President of the University Academic Council at Murdoch in Perth, where he served since 1994 as Deputy Dean of the School of Arts and Associate Dean Learning and Teaching of the School of Arts.

== See also ==
- List of universities in the United Arab Emirates
- Education in Dubai
