= Samita Nandy =

Canadian sociologist

Samita Nandy is a Canadian sociologist, filmmaker and actor. She has been awarded a Doctorate in celebrity culture from the Department of Media and Information at Curtin University, Australia.

== Career ==
Nandy's work explores celebrity and how it and on-line media impact cultural perceptions and has included research into why people feel aggrieved about the death of celebrities. Her PhD dissertation, "Celebrities in Canada: fame and national identity" is archived in the National Library of Australia. She has said that a popular music artist's back catalogue sales increase substantially after their death, because fans treat their work as a piece of immortality. She has taught at Curtin University in Australia, and Canada's Ryerson University and the University of Toronto. She founded the Centre for Media and Celebrity Studies. She has attempted to study the rise of social media, in particular the role Twitter has played in Justin Bieber's popularity.

== Bibliography ==
- Fame in Hollywood North (2015)
