= University of Plymouth International College =

University of Plymouth International College (UPIC)
- Established: 2009
- Location: Plymouth, Devon, England
- Website: http://www.plymouth.ac.uk/upic

University of Plymouth International College, usually referred to as UPIC, is a pathway college in association with University of Plymouth. UPIC is a member of Navitas Limited, an international provider of pathway colleges.

== UPIC ==
UPIC is a pathway provider for University of Plymouth in Devon, UK. UPIC offers undergraduate pathways specifically for international students in a range of subjects including Business, Marketing, Law, Tourism, Engineering, Biological and Biomedical Sciences, Health, Hospitality, Engineering and Computing.

UPIC is based on the campus of University of Plymouth and although students studying at UPIC are mostly taught separately from the other University students, they have full access to all facilities on campus, including the library and IT labs. The students are also often taught by lecturers who also teach at the University. Whilst studying with UPIC, students also receive extra support in the areas of English language and ICT.
