= Curtin College =

- Type: Public
- Established: 2000
- Location: Perth, Australia; 32.007649°S 115.895108°E
- Website: www.curtincollege.edu.au

Curtin College is a college located on the main campus of Curtin University in Perth, Western Australia. It is an Australian tertiary education provider and an integrated pathway provider to Curtin University.

The college is a registered training organization, authorized to offer the college's Certificate IV in Foundation Studies, as well as being registered under the Department of Education Services WA (DESWA) to run diploma programs. Recently, Curtin College began offering pathway programs taught at the Curtin Singapore, the Curtin University Campus in Singapore.

== History ==
The college started operating under its current name 'Curtin College' from August 2010 and was previously known as Curtin International College since it began in 2000. The change coincided with the college's ongoing 10-year anniversary celebrations and the change of name of its partner university from 'Curtin University of Technology' to 'Curtin University'.

== Location and facilities ==
Curtin College is located on Building 205 on the Curtin University campus. Curtin University is Western Australia's largest university with over 44,000 students, of which 8,495 study offshore (2009). The campus is located approximately 8 kilometres to the south of the centre of Perth a large city in Australia.

Curtin College students have access to facilities and services on campus, including a gymnasium and fitness centre at the Curtin Stadium, which was officially opened in October 2009 by Curtin graduate and Para-Olympian Priya Cooper.

Students also have an access to a five-story library at the centre of the campus, and the Curtin Bookshop located in the John Curtin Centre on Building 200.

== Academic programs ==
=== Pre-University Level Program ===
Curtin College delivers the (Certificate IV) Foundation Program and Tertiary Access Program.

The Certificate IV Foundation Studies consist of eight pre-university level units studied over a period of two to three trimesters. For most courses, progression to Diploma requires a pass grade of 50% or better. However, some courses require a higher final average to progress to Diploma stage.

The Tertiary Access Program consists of four pre-university level units studied over a period of one trimester. Progression to Diploma requires a specified final average result.

=== University Level Program ===
Curtin College offers university-level diploma programs in Commerce, Arts and Creative Industries, Built Environment including Architecture, Information Technology, Engineering, Health Sciences, Humanities, Actuarial Science, and Mathematical Sciences and Finance. The diploma is equivalent to Curtin University's Year 1 Degree Program. All students who successfully complete the Curtin College Diploma and who have met the minimum academic entry requirements are guaranteed entry and advanced standing into relevant undergraduate programs at Curtin University.
