= Valerie Glover =

Australian artist

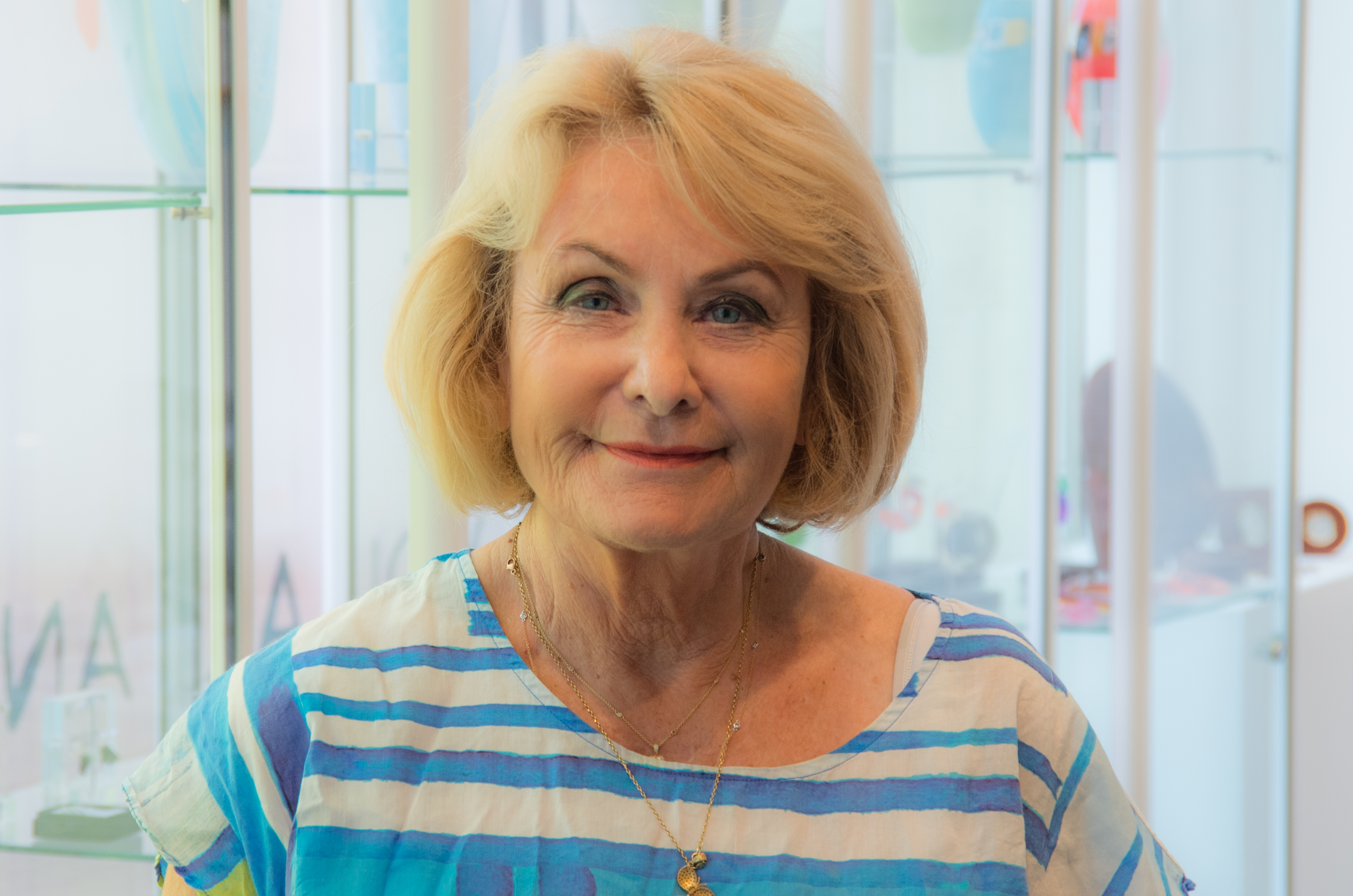
Valerie Glover at the Lawrence Wilson Art Gallery (2020-03-08)

Valerie Glover is an Australian artist. She graduated from Curtin University in 2002 with a Fine Arts degree. Glover is noted for her works which were displayed in Princess Margaret Hospital for Children. As an artist Glover produces collage and acrylic works like the Notre Dame - P&o Hotel - Fremantle. In 2014 the City of Nedlands hosted the Little Bit Long Way exhibition consisting of 85 works created using acrylics, mixed media, and oil painting.
