= Shane Dikolli =

Australian business professor

Shane S. Dikolli
- Education: Curtin University University of Waterloo
- Scientific career
- Fields: Managerial Accounting
- Workplaces: Wilfrid Laurier University KPMG International Headquarters; Curtin University; University of Texas at Austin Duke University
- Thesis: "The Economic Demand For and Consequences of Contracting on Measures of the Drivers of Future Performance." (1998)

Shane S. Dikolli is an Australian accountant who is a Professor of Accounting at University of Virginia's Darden School of Business. He was ranked 4th overall and 1st in accounting in Bloomberg Businessweek Most Popular Business School Professors Among Top 30 Business Schools Rankings. Dikolli was also named Professor of the Week by the Financial Times in August 2011.

Dikolli is known for his research on the performance evaluation of CEOs. He was awarded the Glen McLaughlin Prize for Research in Accounting Ethics and the 2011 Journal of Management Accounting Research Best Paper Award. Professor Dikolli currently holds editorial board membership positions at The Accounting Review, Accounting, Organizations and Society, Contemporary Accounting Research, Journal of Management Accounting Research, and Accounting and Finance.

== Background ==
Dikolli completed his Bachelor of Business in 1986 from Curtin University of Technology in Perth, Western Australia. As a university student, he worked as a Staff Accountant for Hendry, Rae & Court, Chartered Accountants. Dikolli was appointed tenured lecturer in September 1988 at the Curtin University of Technology. Dikolli also became a consultant in the Division of Management Consulting for KPMG International Headquarters from 1991 to 1992. Dikolli completed his Postgraduate Diploma in Business (Accounting) from Curtin University of Technology in 1994. He then completed his Doctor of Philosophy (Accounting) in 1998 from the University of Waterloo in Waterloo, Canada.

In 2000, Dikolli accepted the position of an assistant professor at the University of Texas. After 6 years at the University of Texas and 12 years at the Fuqua School of Business at Duke University, Dikolli moved on to become Associate Professor of Accounting at the University of Virginia’s Darden School of Business. Professor Dikolli teaches an MBA course on managerial accounting in the Full-Time and Weekend Executive Programs at the Darden School of Business.

Dikolli is the cousin of Australian musician Adem K (Kerimofski).

== Publications ==
Dikolli has published his research in the Journal of Accounting Research, Journal of Accounting and Economics, The Accounting Review, Contemporary Accounting Research, Review of Accounting Studies, European Accounting Review, Journal of Services Marketing, Behavioural Research in Accounting, Asian Review of Accounting, and Managerial Auditing Journal. His publications include:

- Dikolli, S.S. (2001) "Agent Employment Horizons and the Contracting Demand for Forward‐looking Performance Measures," Journal of Accounting Research. 39(3): 467‐480.
- Dikolli, S.S. and I. Vaysman, (2006) "Contracting on the Stock Price and Forward Looking Performance Measures," European Accounting Review, 15 (4): 445‐464.
- Dikolli, S.S., S.L. Kulp, and K.L. Sedatole (2009) "Transient Institutional Investors and CEO Contracting," The Accounting Review, 84(3): 737‐770.
- Dikolli, S.S., C. Hofmann, and S.L. Kulp, (2009) "Interrelated Performance Measures, Interactive Effort, and Incentive Weights," Journal of Management Accounting Research, 21: 125‐149.
- Dikolli, S.S., S.A. McCracken, and J.B. Walawski, (2004) "Audit Planning Judgments and Client‐Employee Compensation Contracts," Behavioral Research in Accounting. 16: 45‐62.
- Dikolli, S.S., W.R. Kinney, Jr., and K.L. Sedatole, (2007) "Measuring Customer Relationship Value: The Role of Switching Cost" Contemporary Accounting Research, 24(1): 93‐132.
- Dikolli, S.S. and K.L. Sedatole (2007) "Improvements in the Information Content of Non‐financial Forward‐looking Performance Measures: A Taxonomy and Empirical Application," Journal of Management Accounting Research, 19: 71‐104.
- Bansal, H.S., G. McDougall, S.S. Dikolli, and K.L. Sedatole, (2004) "Relating E‐satisfaction to Behavioral Outcomes: An Empirical Study," Journal of Services Marketing. 18(4): 290‐303.
- Autrey, R.L., S.S. Dikolli, and D. P. Newman, (2007) "Career Concerns and Mandated Disclosure" Journal of Accounting and Public Policy, September/October, 26(5): 527‐554.
- Autrey, R.L., S.S. Dikolli, and D. P. Newman, (2010) "Performance Measure Aggregation, Career Incentives, and Explicit Incentives," Journal of Management Accounting Research, 22(1): 115‐131.

== Honours and awards ==
- Glen McLaughlin Prize for Research in Accounting Ethics, 2012/13, with Bill Mayew & Thomas Steffen.
- Best Paper Award, Journal of Management Accounting Research 2009‐2011, With Christian Hofmann & Susan Kulp.
- Bloomberg Businessweek Most Popular Business School Professors Among Top 30 Business Schools (ranked 4th overall and 1st in Accounting; August, 2011; http://buswk.co/pquVSx).
- Financial Times, "Professor of the Week," 14 October 2011.
- Nominated for The Economist Intelligence Unit "Business Professor of the Year Award," (221 professors worldwide nominated across all business disciplines and schools, 2012.
- DaimlerChrysler Award for Innovation & Excellence in Core Course Teaching, Full-time MBA (2007).
- Excellence in Teaching Award (Core Course), Weekend Executive MBA Program, (2008).
- DaimlerChrysler Award for Innovation & Excellence in Elective Course Teaching, Full-time MBA (2009, 2010, 2011, 2012)
- Excellence in Teaching Award (Core Course), Weekend Executive MBA Program, (2011).
