= Curtin University =

University in Perth, Western Australia

- Former names: List: Perth Technical School (1900–1929); Perth Technical College (1929–1966); Western Australian Institute of Technology (1966–1986); Curtin University of Technology (1986–2010)
- Motto: Look ever forward
- Type: Public research university
- Established: 1900; 126 years ago (antecedent); 1986; 40 years ago (as university)
- Accreditation: TEQSA
- Affiliations: Australian Technology Network (ATN)
- Budget: A$1.1 billion (2023)
- Visitor: Governor of Western Australia (ex officio)
- Chancellor: Vanessa Guthrie
- Vice-Chancellor: Harlene Hayne
- Academic staff: 1,717 (FTE, 2023)
- Administrative staff: 2,103 (FTE, 2023)
- Total staff: 3,820 (FTE, 2023)
- Students: 61,193 (2023)
- Undergraduates: 39,852 (2023)
- Postgraduates: 9,617 coursework (2023); 1,897 research (2023)
- Other students: 11,832 (2023)
- Location: Kent Street, Bentley, Perth, Western Australia, 6102, Australia; 32°00′17″S 115°53′37″E
- Campus: 116 hectares (1.2 km^{2}); Suburban and regional with multiple sites
- Named after: John Curtin
- Colours: Gold Black
- Nickname: Carnabys
- Sporting affiliations: UniSport; EAEN; UBL
- Mascot: Carl the Carnaby
- Website: curtin.edu.au

Curtin University (previously Curtin University of Technology and Western Australian Institute of Technology) is an Australian public research university based in Bentley, Perth, Western Australia. It is named after John Curtin, Prime Minister of Australia from 1941 to 1945, and is Western Australia's largest university, with 58,607 students in 2022.

WAIT was established in 1966. Curtin was conferred university status after the Parliament of Western Australia passed legislation in 1986. Since then, the university has expanded its presence and has campuses in Singapore, Malaysia, Dubai and Mauritius, and has ties with 90 exchange universities in 20 countries. The university comprises five main faculties with over 95 specialists centres. It had a campus in Sydney from 2005 to 2016.

Curtin University is a member of the Australian Technology Network. Curtin is active in research in a range of academic and practical fields. In 2015, Curtin's research funds reached $87.5 million, which was an increase from the previous year. As of 2020, it is Western Australia's only university whose students have won the Australian Institute of Nuclear Science and Engineering's Postgraduate Student Gold Medal.

== History ==
Curtin University was founded in 1966 as the Western Australian Institute of Technology. The four people who drove its establishment were Lesley Phillips, who was Superintendent of Technical Education from 1943 to 1948; George Hayman, (Note: William George Inglis (George) Hayman, Superintendent of Technical Education from 1948 until his retirement in 1962.) who held the same position from 1948 to 1962; T. L. Robertson, Director of Education; and Haydn Williams, Director of Technical Education.

Its nucleus comprised the tertiary programs of the Perth Technical College, which opened in 1900. The university's Bentley campus was selected in 1962 and officially opened in 1966. The first students enrolled in 1967. Haydn Williams was the first director of WAIT.

In 1969, three more institutions were merged with WAIT: the Kalgoorlie School of Mines (opened in 1902), the Muresk Agricultural College (opened in 1926), and the Schools of Physiotherapy and Occupational Therapy (in operation since the 1950s at Shenton Park). Between 1966 and 1976 WAIT experienced an expansion from 2,000 to 10,000 students.

In December 1986 WAIT was made a university, under provisions of the Western Australian Institute of Technology Amendment Act 1986. The change sparked a debate in which the federal government questioned whether WAIT was automatically entitled to university-level funding simply by achieving university status. However, this situation was resolved by the Dawkins reform, which restructured Australian higher education. Curtin University took its name from former Prime Minister of Australia John Curtin. In 1987, Curtin University of Technology became Western Australia's third university and Australia's first university of technology. By the mid-1990s, it had enrolments of 20,000 students, making it one of Australia's largest universities.

In 1993, Curtin founded a graduate business school in St Georges Terrace. In 2002 it was moved to Murray Street, where it remains. The school was developed on the foundation of Curtin's existing Master of Business Administration program.

In 2005, Curtin and Murdoch University were engaged in a feasibility study into the possibility of a merger. On 7 November 2005, the institutions announced that a merger would not be undertaken.

In 2008, Curtin opened a campus in Singapore, its second offshore presence. In 2009, Curtin became the first university in the Australian Technology Network to be listed on the Academic Ranking of World Universities of research universities.

In 2010, Curtin dropped the "of Technology" suffix, from then operating as "Curtin University".

Curtin Law School was established in 2012, enrolling its first cohort of 120 students in the first semester of 2013 following accreditation from the Legal Practice Board of Western Australia.

Curtin Medical School's five-year medical programme received accreditation from the Australian Medical Council in 2016, and its first cohort began studying at the Bentley campus in 2017. Following the medical school's admission of a full cohort of students in 2022, the federal government committed $20 million in annual funding to the school. Construction of Curtin's Midland Campus in the redeveloped Midland Workshops precinct was completed in 2019. The campus officially opened on 22 November 2019 as a clinical training base for medical sciences students.

Curtin Business School received EQUIS accreditation in 2021, and it also holds AACSB accreditation. Its AMBA accreditation, however, was not renewed in 2014.

In October 2026 the Cook Government announced it was developing a business case to merge Curtin University with Murdoch University and the University of Western Australia.

== Campuses and buildings ==
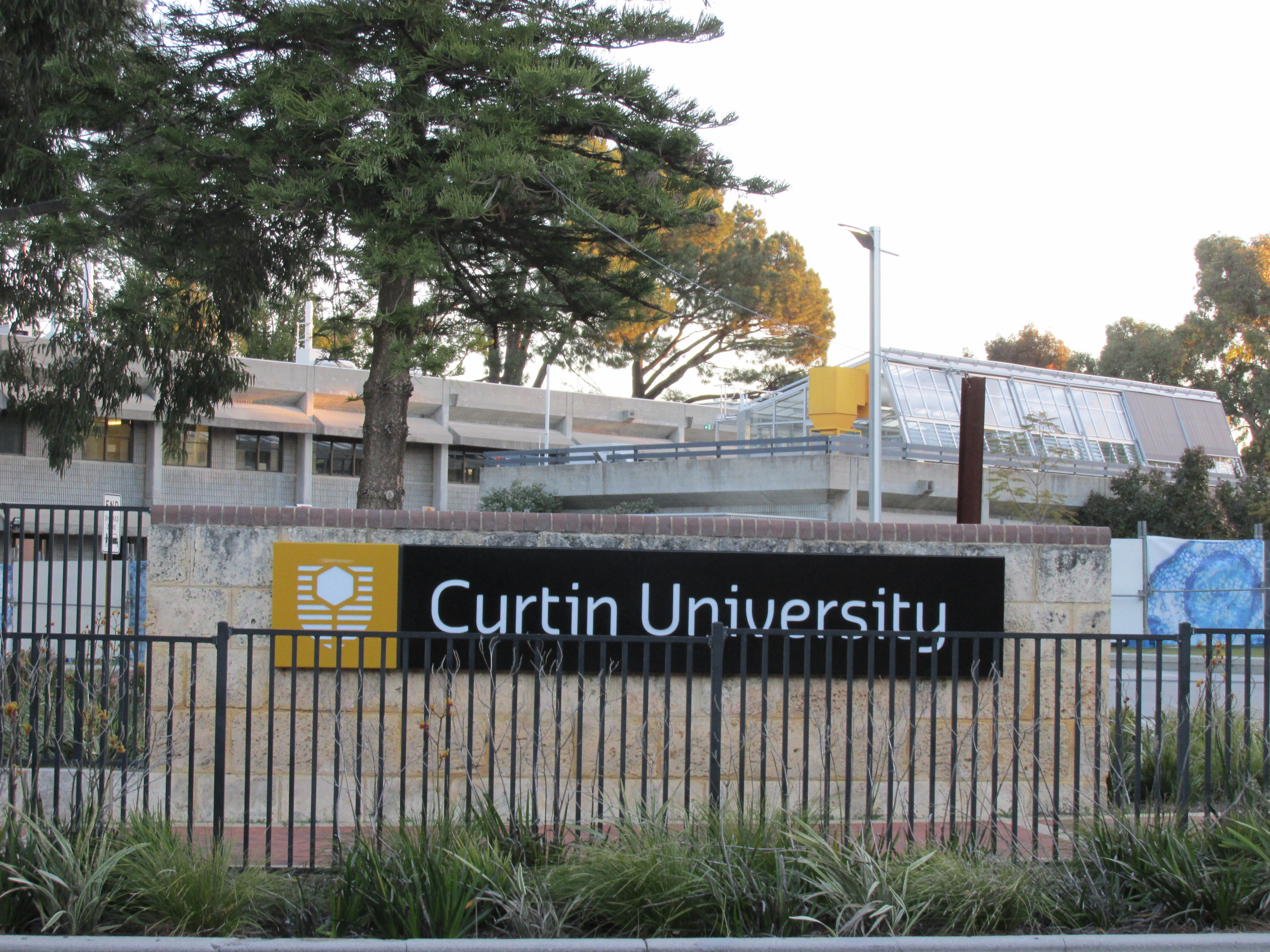
Entrance as viewed from Curtin University bus station

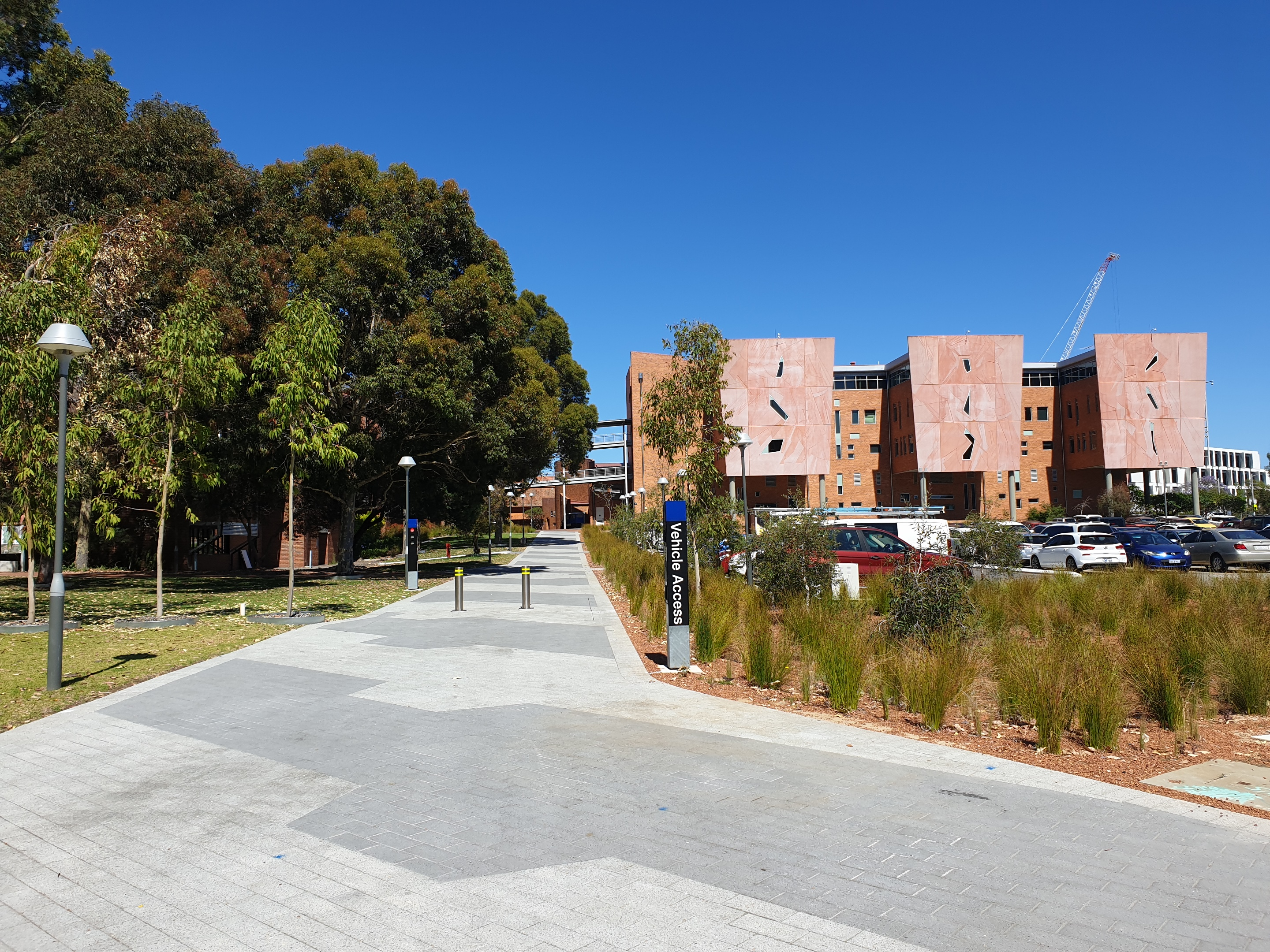
Building 408 (Business and Physiotherapy)

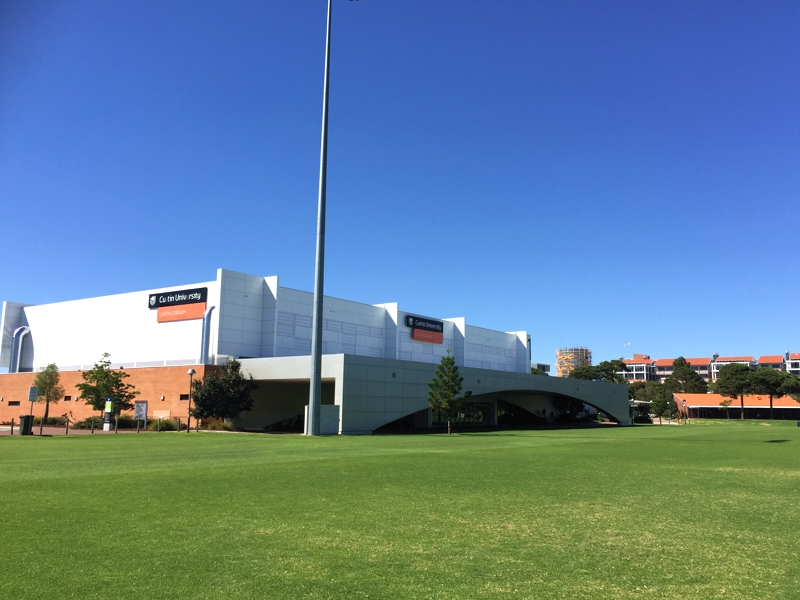
Curtin Stadium

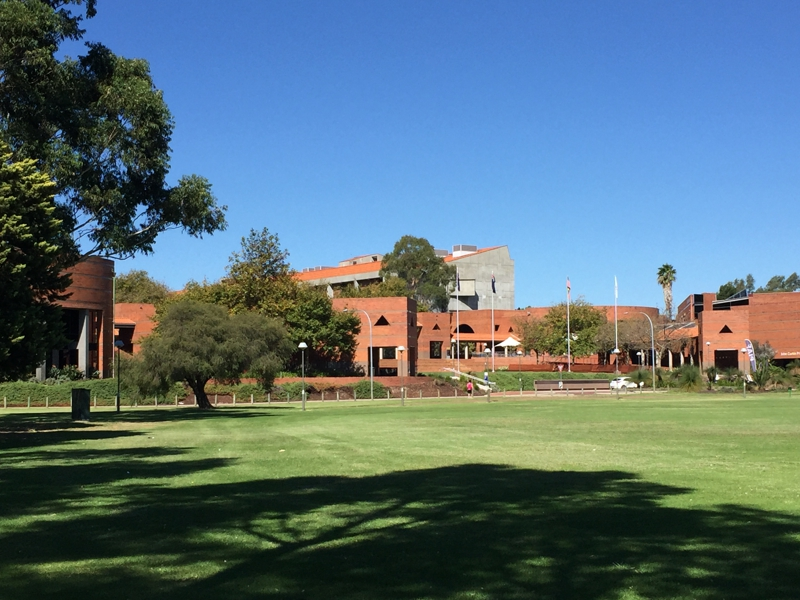
Chancellery Building

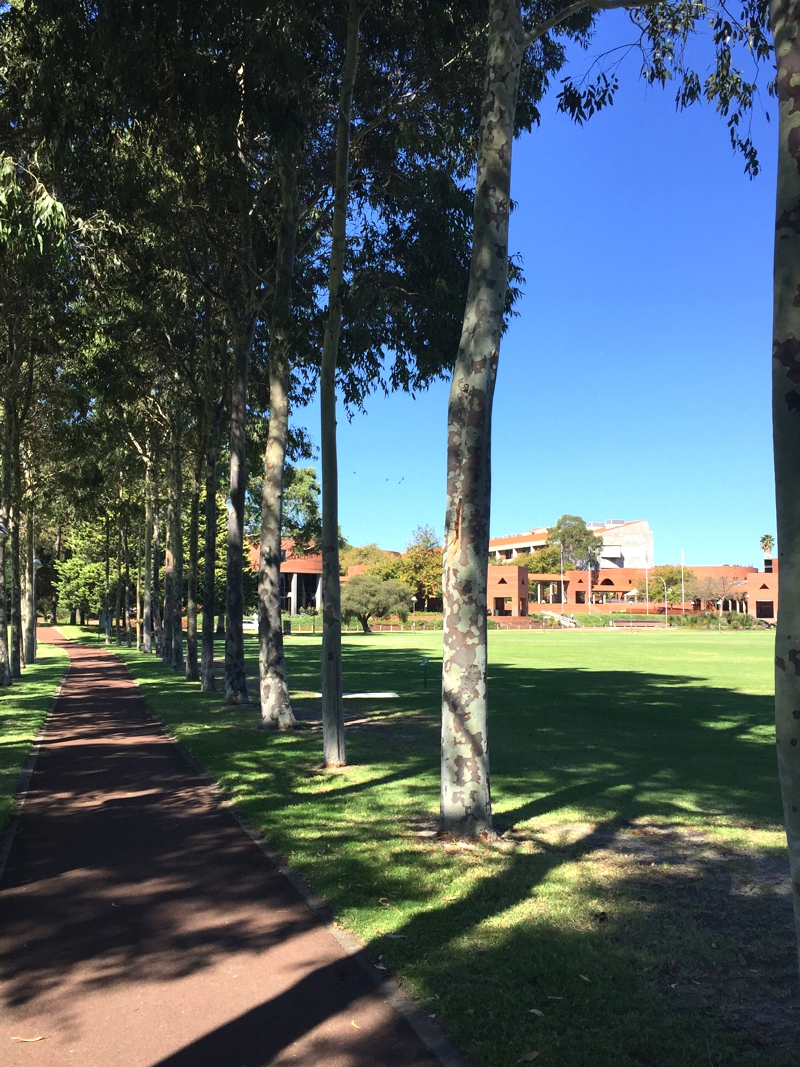
Grounds

=== Perth and regional WA ===
Curtin University's main campus is in Bentley, Western Australia, about 6 kilometres (3.7 mi) south-east of the Perth central business district. The campus was developed on a former pine plantation established in the 1930s. The campus was masterplanned by public works architect Vin Daviesin the 1960s. He arranged the buildings and sports fields in a grid pattern around the existing plantation.

Construction of Curtin Exchange, the first phase of the $500 million Greater Curtin master plan for the Bentley campus, began in September 2019. According to Business News, the project comprised housing for 900 students, a 60-room hotel, 38 apartments and 15 retail units. Furthermore, the project included the construction of the School of Design and Built Environment, which was undertaken by the infrastructure group Landlease.

Curtin has multiple smaller off-site campuses in the Perth metropolitan area. The Graduate School of Business building is in the Perth central business district in the renovated former Government Printing Office, and the law school is on Murray Street in the old Public Health Department and Chief Secretary's building, a listed building on the State Register of Heritage Places. In 2016, Curtin entered into an agreement with the National Trust of Australia (WA) to use the restored Old Perth Boys' School at 139 St Georges Terrace for community and industry engagement. The Curtin Connect project, which included the refurbishment of the university's customer and student services area, was completed in 2017. As part of the project, the former basement car park was converted into a two-storey office arrangement. In 2018, Curtin renovated the original Perth Technical College building at 137 St Georges Terrace to create meeting rooms and learning spaces for professional development and postgraduate courses. Curtin opened a medical campus near St John of God Midland Public and Private Hospitals in November 2019. In 2024, approval was granted for the development of B316, a $200 million sciences building at Bentley. The building and landscape were designed by Grimshaw Architects in collaboration with GHD Design and Aspect Studios. Spanning 22,000 square feet (2,000 m^{2}) across six storeys, the facility includes research buildings, shared support spaces, science learning hubs, a loading area and teaching labs for the WA School of Mines, as well as accommodation for around 1,500 people. The project was expected to be completed by mid-2026, but was subsequently delayed until 2027.

During the 2016 public art festival, 16 different Australian and international artists took part in painting eight buildings on the Bentley campus with murals.

Curtin operated a campus in the suburb of Joondalup, which opened in 1994. It was operated in conjunction with the Australian Institute for University Study. The campus was closed around 2005. After being abandoned for several years it is now used for North Metropolitan TAFE campus.

Exploration Geophysics and Petroleum Engineering are at the co-location research facilities of the Australian Resources Research Centre (ARRC), which also houses offices of CSIRO Earth Science and Resource Engineering and National Measurement Institute. The ARRC is in the Technology Park Bentley, adjacent to the main Bentley campus. Some university staff, researchers and students on practicum work in other locations, such as the Oral Health Centre of WA (OHCWA) in Nedlands and at Royal Perth Hospital, amongst other organisations.

Curtin has two bus stations, connected to the Transperth public transport network. The stations are also linked to the Mandurah railway line's Canning Bridge Station by a shuttle bus service. Curtin also has an internal bus network trialling autonomous buses on campus. Curtin Central bus station, an additional transport hub connected to the existing station on Hayman Road, opened in February 2019. Funded by Curtin University and the Public Transport Authority, the new station was built with the aim of improving connectivity. The bus station can accommodate up to 80 bus services.

Curtin has campuses outside Perth, the largest being the Western Australian School of Mines at Kalgoorlie, and a number of micro-campuses in Esperance, Margaret River, Geraldton, and elsewhere. Nursing is the only course offered in Geraldton. The Muresk Institute at Northam left Curtin in 2012.

==== Hayman Theatre ====
The Hayman Theatre was established in 1973 as Hayman Hall, for the use of theatre arts students. The Hall's name derives from George Hayman, who played a major part in establishing WAIT in 1967. The theatre study company Theatreground as well as the Western Australian Theatre Company used the space. It was refurbished in 1977, creating the Theatre Upstairs above the main stage. After the Bentley Campus was expanded, in 2017 Hayman Theatre moved to Building 302.

=== Dubai campus ===
In April 2017 Curtin University established its newest campus in Dubai at Dubai International Academic City. Australian Ambassador to the UAE HE Arthur Spyrou officially opened the campus on 10 September 2017. Curtin University Dubai courses use the same structure and unit curriculum as those at the Bentley campus. Curtin University Dubai is accredited by the Knowledge and Human Development Authority (KHDA). The academic qualifications Curtin grants are certified by KHDA and recognised in the Emirate of Dubai by all public and private entities.

=== Malaysia campus ===
Curtin's largest international campus is in Miri, Sarawak, Malaysia. Curtin's operations in Miri began in February 1999. In 2002, a purpose-built campus was opened as Curtin's first offshore campus and the first foreign university campus in East Malaysia. It has around 4,000 students from over 45 countries, and academics from more than 15 countries. Curtin Malaysia is the only approved CISCO Networking University in Miri and Brunei. In 2016, the campus opened a Faculty of Engineering and Science building in its Skylark Precinct. The facility comprises three lecture halls with a capacity of up to 240 people on the ground floor, four classrooms with a capacity of 56–84 people, as well as office space, meeting rooms and a lecturer rooms for staff.

=== Singapore campus ===
Curtin University opened a Singapore-based campus on 23 November 2008. Curtin Singapore courses use the same structure and unit curriculum as those at the Bentley campus. In 2022, Curtin Singapore moved to a new campus located at 10 Science Park Road, The Alpha, Science Park II.

=== Mauritius campus ===
Curtin University opened its fourth international campus in Mauritius on 3 May 2018 on the campus of Charles Telfair Institute in Moka south of Port Louis.

=== Sri Lanka campus ===
In 2024, Curtin transformed a long-standing teaching partnership into a new campus, establishing Curtin University Colombo in Sri Lanka.

=== Former Sydney campus (2005–2016) ===
Curtin University Sydney (Curtin Sydney) was established on 20 June 2005. The first campus was in The Rocks area. It later moved to the suburb of Chippendale, where it occupied the Berlei Building. Curtin Sydney's operation was contracted out to private tertiary education provider Navitas Group. It offered international students diploma, undergraduate and postgraduate courses. In 2014 Curtin Sydney was involved in a cash-for-results scandal where students since 2012 had paid MyMaster, a Sydney company, up to $1,000 each to write essays and assignments for them, as well as to sit online tests. In 2015, Curtin announced that Curtin Sydney would close in 2017.

== Governance and structure ==
=== Faculties and departments ===
From 2007, the university's teaching and research was divided into five faculties (previously known as divisions), which each include a number of schools. These schools were consolidated in 2020 during a period of staff cuts. These are:

- Centre for Aboriginal Studies
- Faculty of Business and Law
  - School of Accounting, Economics and Finance
  - School of Management and Marketing
  - Curtin Law School
- Faculty of Health Sciences
  - Curtin Medical School
  - Curtin School of Allied Health
  - Curtin School of Nursing
  - Curtin School of Population Health
- Faculty of Humanities
  - School of Design and the Built Environment
  - School of Media, Creative Arts and Social Inquiry
  - School of Education
- Faculty of Science and Engineering
  - School of Civil and Mechanical Engineering
  - School of Earth and Planetary Sciences
  - School of Electrical Engineering, Computing and Mathematical Sciences
  - School of Molecular and Life Sciences
  - Western Australian School of Mines: Minerals and Energy Engineering

=== Libraries and collections ===
The main library building is the TL Robertson Library, on the Bentley campus. It opened in 1972. After the building was extended in the 1990s, the university began a major refurbishment in 2021, due for completion in 2023. Hames Sharley and Schmidt Hammer Lassen Architects were commissioned to redesign the 1972 Brutalist building at a cost of $60 million. The redesign incorporated a central atrium and an additional 2,000 square feet (190 m^{2}) of internal space. Also on the Bentley campus is the John Curtin Prime Ministerial Library, holding a large collection of papers relating to John Curtin as well as other special collections, including the papers of political figures John Dawkins, Geoff Gallop, Hazel Hawke, and Carmen Lawrence, and Curtin academics Mike Daube (tobacco control) and Jules Black (sexology).

==== John Curtin Gallery ====
The John Curtin Gallery (JCG) is on the Bentley campus, in building 200A. It has a focus on contemporary art, learning and research.

== Academic profile ==
The university is one of the partners in the Western Australian Pregnancy Cohort (Raine) Study, one of the largest cohorts of pregnancy, childhood, adolescence and early adulthood to be carried out anywhere in the world.

The Bankwest Curtin Economics Centre (BCEC) was established in 2012. It was set up through a partnership between Curtin and Bankwest. In 2025, its funding arrangement was subsequently renewed for a further three years to support social and economic research in areas including housing affordability, gender equity, poverty, and economic diversification.

Curtin's Creative Writing staff and alumni have won the Miles Franklin Award seven times.

Curtin students participate in the Binar Space Programme's satellite research. In 2023, one of the final-year undergraduate physics and engineering students led a prototype satellite launch to test instruments and designs. As part of its BinarX program, Curtin also involves high school students in the development of experimental payloads for spacecraft intended for orbital missions.

=== Academic reputation ===
University rankings

Global – Overall
- ARWU World: 201–300 (2025)
- CWTS World: 280 (Note: The CWTS Leiden Ranking is based on P (top 10%).) (2024)
- QS World: 183 (2026)
- QS Employability: 201–250 (2022)
- THE World: 251–300 (2026)
- USNWR Global: 152 (25/26)

National – Overall
- ARWU National: 9–13 (2025)
- CWTS National: 12 (2024)
- ERA National: 16 (2018)
- QS National: 12 (2026)
- THE National: 14–20 (2026)
- USNWR National: 10 (25/26)
- AFR National: =22 (2025)

In the 2024 Aggregate Ranking of Top Universities, which measures aggregate performance across the QS, THE and ARWU rankings, the university attained a position of #191 (11th nationally).

National publications

In the Australian Financial Review Best Universities Ranking 2025, the university was tied #22 amongst Australian universities.

Global publications

In the 2026 Quacquarelli Symonds World University Rankings (published 2025), the university attained a position of #183 (12th nationally).

In the Times Higher Education World University Rankings 2026 (published 2025), the university attained a position of #251–300 (tied 14–20th nationally).

In the 2025 Academic Ranking of World Universities, the university attained a position of #201–300 (tied 9–13th nationally).

In the 2025–2026 U.S. News & World Report Best Global Universities, the university attained a position of #152 (10th nationally).

In the CWTS Leiden Ranking 2024, the university attained a position of #280 (12th nationally).

=== Student outcomes ===
The Australian Government's QILT (Note: Abbreviation for Quality Indicators for Learning and Teaching.) conducts national surveys documenting the student life cycle from enrolment through to employment. These surveys place more emphasis on criteria such as student experience, graduate outcomes and employer satisfaction than perceived reputation, research output and citation counts.

In the 2023 Employer Satisfaction Survey, graduates of the university had an overall employer satisfaction rate of 90.1%.

In the 2023 Graduate Outcomes Survey, graduates of the university had a full-time employment rate of 80.9% for undergraduates and 87.9% for postgraduates. The initial full-time salary was A$75,000 for undergraduates and A$93,000 for postgraduates.

In the 2023 Student Experience Survey, undergraduates at the university rated the quality of their entire educational experience at 77.4% meanwhile postgraduates rated their overall education experience at 75.5%.

=== Affiliations and partnerships ===
In 2022, the university formed an international university alliance with the University of Aberdeen in Scotland, United Kingdom and University of Calgary in Alberta, Canada to address global challenges together. The alliance provides joint research centres, collaborative academic programs, industry linkage, and student and staff mobility exchanges. Curtin is also a member of the Australian Technology Network.

== Student life ==
=== Student union ===
The Curtin Student Guild is the student union at Curtin University. It was founded in 1969 as the WAIT Student Guild.

The guild provides student representation services through the provision of faculty, international, postgraduate and equity representatives and the professional support service Student Assist.

The guild operates most food and beverage outlets on campus, including Guild Cafés (Central, Engineering, Library), Angazi, Concept Coffee Co and Mallokup food outlets. Other commercial services include G-Mart, Curtin University's general store, printing, stationery and news outlet and The Tav.

The guild operates and funds all Curtin student clubs and societies. It also runs a number of events throughout the year, most notably the Toga Party held in semester one and the previous notable event Grasslands Music Festival held in semester two. The guild publishes Grok magazine.

The Student Guild is governed independently of the university by students through the Guild Council, which consists of executive members: president, vice-presidents, secretary and councillors. All other representatives sit on the Representation Board. Students elect their representatives annually in September. Major Groups that contest elections include Illuminate, consisting of broadly left-wing Independent students; Left Action, aligned with Socialist Alternative; groups aligned with the Labor Right; and Joke Ticket's, from various political leanings. The Guild currently has an Illuminate majority.

=== Sports and athletics ===
==== Basketball ====
As of 2023, Curtin University's basketball teams, the Carnabys, play in the University Basketball League (UBL).

==== Soccer ====
The men's team of the Curtin University Football Club is based on the main campus. The club currently (2026) competes in the Football West State League Division 2.

The Curtin University FC women's team were one of the inaugural teams in the National Premier Leagues WA Women competition (which commenced in 2020), prior to which they were in the Women State League Division 1.

=== Student accommodation ===
Curtin University offers on campus accommodation at five separate precincts, managed by UniLodge: Kurrajong Village, Erica Underwood House, Guild House, Vickery House and St Catherine's College.

== Notable people ==
=== Notable alumni ===
Notable people who have attended Curtin University include:

==== Humanities ====
- Mouza Sulaiman Mohamed Al-Wardi, museum curator, Director of the Collections Department at the National Museum (Oman)
- James Angus, sculptor
- Ain Bandial, Bruneian journalist and editor
- Natalie Barr, news presenter on Seven Network's Sunrise
- Carrie Bickmore, co-host of The Project (Australian TV program)
- John Butler, musician
- Michaelia Cash, former Attorney-General of Australia, member of Australian Senate
- Priya Cooper, Gold medal swimmer at the Sydney Paralympic Games
- Natalia Cooper, journalist for Nine News at the Nine Network Sydney
- Priya Cooper, Gold medal swimmer at the Sydney Paralympic Games
- Judy Davis, Golden Globe and Emmy Award-winning actress
- Jessica De Gouw, actor
- Shane Dikolli, accountant
- Jon Doust, comedian, writer, novelist and professional speaker
- Elissa Down, film director
- Valerie Glover, artist
- Claire Hooper, comedian
- Kenneth Maxwell, educationist
- Hannah McGlade, academic, human rights advocate and lawyer
- Judith Lucy, comedian
- Kate Mulvany OAM, actor and playwright
- Frances O'Connor, actor
- David McComb, lead singer of The Triffids, songwriter and poet
- Sheila McHale, former Cabinet minister in the Government of Western Australia
- Ljiljanna Ravlich, former Cabinet minister in the Government of Western Australia
- Kate Raynes-Goldie, game designer and social media scholar
- Tracy Ryan, poet
- Philip Salom, poet
- Elaine Smith, actor
- Ben Templesmith, illustrator & author of 30 Days of Night
- Tim Winton, author
- Siti Rozaimeriyanty, architect and politician
- Romaizah Mohd Salleh, Bruneian Minister of Education

==== Other faculties ====
- Aboriginal Studies
  - Joan Winch, nurse and educator
- Business and Law
  - Rozaina Adam, member of Parliament in Maldives
  - Cody Fern, actor
  - Samantha Hall, entrepreneur, environmental and Antarctic researcher
  - Brad Hogg, cricketer
  - Dean Israelite, film director
- Health Sciences
  - John Worsfold, coach of the Essendon Football Club and ex-coach of the West Coast Eagles
- Science and Engineering
  - Jim Geelen, professor
  - Samantha Hall, entrepreneur, environmental and Antarctic researcher
  - Andrew Long, geophysicist
  - Zaneta Mascarenhas, engineer and Labor member for Swan
- Arts and media
  - Nguyễn Phương Khánh, Miss Earth 2018
  - Samita Nandy, Canadian sociologist

=== Academics and staff ===
Curtin's faculty includes prominent scholars such as environmental scientist Peter Newman, writer Kim Scott and isotope geochemist Kliti Grice.

Past prominent faculty members include the postmodernist Niall Lucy, writer Elizabeth Jolley and journalist Robert Duffield. The broadcaster Erica Underwood was the first woman to serve on the main council in 1974 when it was the council of the Western Australian Institute of Technology.

== Controversies ==
Curtin has become active in research and partnerships overseas, particularly in mainland China, and has received funding from major Chinese companies, such as Tencent. It is involved in a number of business, management, and research projects, particularly in supercomputing, where the university participates in a tri-continental array with nodes in Perth, Beijing, and Edinburgh. The Chinese Premier Wen Jiabao visited the Woodside-funded hydrocarbon research facility during his visit to Australia in 2005. Funding from major Chinese companies connected to the state have led to concerns that Curtin University has limited academic freedom on certain topics.

In 2020, a roof at Curtin University collapsed, killing a 23-year-old construction worker after he fell more than 20 m (66 ft), and leaving two other construction workers injured.

== See also ==
- API Network, a publisher associated with the university and University of Queensland
- List of universities in Australia
