= Robert Duffield (journalist) =

Australian journalist

Robert Duffield (1935 - 2000) was a journalist who served as foreign editor of The Australian from 1968 until 1974. His single most memorable work was Rogue Bull, a 1979 biography of Lang Hancock. Duffield won the Clarion Prize at the 1988 WA Media Awards. He spent his last years as a lecturer at the Western Australian Institute of Technology, now Curtin University. He inspired a whole generation of journalists from the first journalism school in WA. Those students have fanned out around the world with many still active in journalism. He died in August 2000. This was followed by a wake in Surry Hills Sydney where his Australian Newspaper colleagues toasted him and his career. Robert Duffield was the leader of the infamous walk out of journalists at the Australian over the editorial treatment of Prime Minister Gough Whitlam.
