= Curtin Mauritius =

University campus in Mauritius

- Curtin Emblem
- Motto: Look ever forward
- Type: Private
- Established: 3 May 2018; 8 years ago
- Parent institution: Curtin University
- Affiliations: Australian Technology Network (ATN)
- Chancellor: Andrew Crane
- Vice-Chancellor: Harlene Hayne
- Pro Vice-Chancellor and President: Lina Pelliccione
- Students: 1,644 (2022)
- Location: Moka, Mauritius
- Campus: Urban park
- Named after: John Curtin
- Colors: Gold Black
- Nickname: Carnabys
- Mascot: Carl the Carnaby
- Website: curtinmauritius.ac.mu

Curtin Mauritius is the Mauritian campus of Curtin University, a public university in Australia. It offers undergraduate and postgraduate degree programs in healthcare, information technology, commerce, design and communications. Curtin University is named after John Curtin, a prominent Prime Minister of Australia during World War II from 1941 to 1945, and is the largest university in the state of Western Australia with 58,607 students globally in 2022. It is the only Australian university campus in Africa and was formally opened on 3 May 2018 by Pravind Jugnauth, the prime minister of Mauritius.

Curtin has a partnership with the Toulouse Business School with which it offers dual degree programs with integrated overseas study at Toulouse (France) or Barcelona (Spain). It also offers foundational programs that provide entry into degree programs with credit. Curtin Mauritius is operated in partnership with Charles Telfair Education, which also offers vocational education programs through TAFE Western Australia that can also be used as a pathway into the undergraduate studies.

In Australia, the university is known for having high employer satisfaction rates. According to the 2022 Employer Satisfaction Survey published by the Australian Government's QILT, the university received the highest overall employer satisfaction (89.7%) among all universities in Australia. The university also ranks within the top 200 universities according to the Quacquarelli Symonds and U.S. News university ranking publications, while ranking somewhat lower on others.

== History ==
Curtin University is the modern descendant of the Perth Technical School, established in 1900, which later became the Western Australia Institute of Technology in 1966. The institution received university status in 1986 to form the Curtin University of Technology, named after paramount World War II Prime Minister of Australia John Curtin. In 2010, it removed the suffix from its name and became simply Curtin University. As of 2022, it is the largest university in the state of Western Australia with 58,607 students enrolled across its domestic and overseas campuses.

Curtin University has been present in Mauritius since 2004 through the Charles Telfair Institute that provided study programs for the university. Curtin Mauritius was later established with an initial enrolment of 2,457 students in 2018. The campus was formally opened by Pravind Jugnauth, the prime minister of Mauritius, on 3 May 2018 and is the university's fourth overseas campus.

== Location and facilities ==
Curtin Mauritius' campus include a film studio, student lounge, library, bookshop, student accommodation, canteen and various sports facilities. There is also a Synergy Gym near the campus.

== Academic profile ==
University rankings

Global – Overall
- ARWU World: 201-300 (2024)
- CWTS World: 280 (Note: The CWTS Leiden Ranking is based on P(top 10%).) (2024)
- QS World: 174 (2025)
- QS Employability: 201-250 (2022)
- THE World: 251-300 (2025)
- USNWR Global: 164 (24/25)

Curtin University is a Western Australian university and perception of the university may differ across the different countries where it has campuses. In the 2024 Aggregate Ranking of Top Universities, which measures aggregate performance across the QS, THE and ARWU rankings, the university attained a position of #191 (11th nationally).

Ranking publications

In the 2025 Quacquarelli Symonds World University Rankings (published 2024), the university attained a position of #174.

In the Times Higher Education World University Rankings 2025 (published 2024), the university attained a position of #251-300.

In the 2024 Academic Ranking of World Universities, the university attained a position of #201-300.

In the 2024–2025 U.S. News & World Report Best Global Universities, the university attained a position of #164.

In the CWTS Leiden Ranking 2024, the university attained a position of #280.

== Notable people ==
Notable alumni of Curtin University's Mauritius campus include:

- Yanish Engutsamy - Mauritian radio jockey and personality

The Pro Vice-Chancellor and President of Curtin Mauritius is currently Professor Lina Pelliccione.
