= Edith Cowan College =

Tertiary education provider in Australia

Coordinates: 31.9189°S 115.8680°E

- Type: Private
- Affiliations: Edith Cowan University; Navitas Group
- Principal: Amanda Peterson
- Administrative staff: 80 (including sessional teaching staff)
- Location: Perth, Western Australia, Australia
- Campus: Joondalup and Mount Lawley
- Website: www.edithcowancollege.edu.au

Edith Cowan College, previously known as Perth Institute of Business and Technology, is an Australian tertiary education provider in Perth, Western Australia and is accredited by Government under the Higher Education Act 2004 to provide a range of higher education courses. Edith Cowan College has been in partnership with Edith Cowan University since 1994. Since then over 9,000 students have successfully transitioned into Edith Cowan University.

== History ==
ECC is the founding college of the Navitas Group, and the largest group of Higher Education colleges in Australia. Navitas has colleges in most state capitals plus sister colleges in London, Africa and Canada. Since 1994 ECC and Edith Cowan University have worked together to provide pathway programs to university in Australia.

ECC is located on ECU’s Mount Lawley and Joondalup campuses. The Joondalup campus is 25 km (16 mi) from Perth.

== Academic programs ==
ECC provides diploma pathway programs in the areas of commerce, hotel management, communications and creative industries, computer/IT science, engineering studies, and health studies including nursing, which lead into the 2nd year of the respective degree courses at Edith Cowan University. A three-semester system allows students to complete most courses in eight months.

ECC also offers English language courses for people from non-English speaking countries and direct entry pathways for international students wishing to undertake university study. ECC offers the academic English program at all levels from beginner to advanced.

Program	CRICOS code
Diploma of Commerce	092032G
Diploma of Hotel Management	092034F
Diploma of Science (Computing/IT)	092035E
Diploma of Communications and Creative Industries	092033G
Diploma of Science (Engineering Studies)	092036D
Diploma of Science (Health Studies)	092037C
