= CWTS Leiden Ranking =

Annual global university ranking

- Editor: Mark Neijssel, Nees Jan van Eck, Ludo Waltman
- Categories: Higher education
- Frequency: Annual
- Publisher: Leiden University, Netherlands
- First issue: 2006; 20 years ago
- Country: Netherlands
- Language: English
- Website: www.leidenranking.com

The CWTS Leiden Ranking is an annual global university ranking based exclusively on bibliometric indicators. The rankings are compiled by the Centre for Science and Technology Studies (Dutch: Centrum voor Wetenschap en Technologische Studies, CWTS) at Leiden University in the Netherlands. The Clarivate Analytics bibliographic database Web of Science is used as the source of the publication and citation data.

The Leiden Ranking ranks universities worldwide by number of academic publications according to the volume and citation impact of the publications at those institutions. The rankings take into account differences in language, discipline and institutional size. Multiple ranking lists are released according to various bibliometric normalization and impact indicators, including the number of publications, citations per publication, and field-normalized impact per publication. In addition to citation impact, the Leiden Ranking also ranks universities by scientific collaboration, including collaboration with other institutions and collaboration with an industry partner.

The first edition of the Leiden Ranking was produced in 2007. The 2014 rankings include 750 universities worldwide, which were selected based on the number of articles and reviews published by authors affiliated with those institutions in 2009–2012 in so-called "core" journals, a set of English-language journals with international scope and a "sufficiently large" number of references in the Web of Science database.

According to the Netherlands Centre for Science and Technology Studies, the crown indicator is Indicator 4 (PP top 10%), and is the only one presented in university rankings by the Swiss State Secretariat for Education, Research and Innovation website (UniversityRankings.ch).

== Results ==
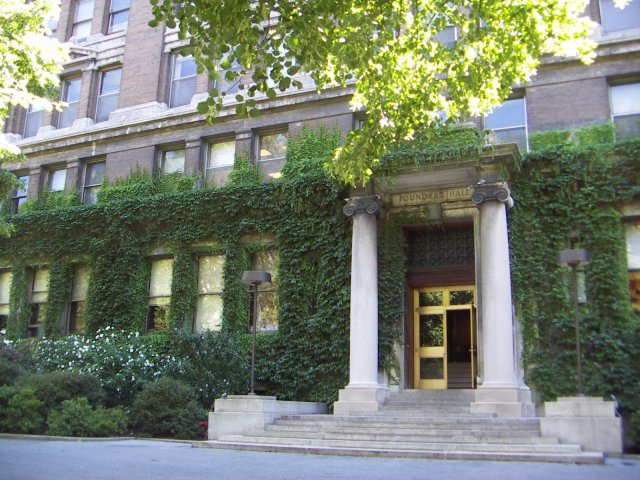
Rockefeller University was ranked first in 2014 by citation impact

As of 2026, Chinese universities dominate the rankings, with 20 out of the top 25 universities ranked being in China, led by Zhejiang University, while in previous years, the top was heavily dominated by American universities. In the 2014 rankings, Rockefeller University was first by citation impact, as measured by both mean citation score and mean normalized citation score, as well as by the proportion of papers belonging to the top 10% in their field. Notably, the University of Oxford, the University of Cambridge, and other British universities score much lower than in other university rankings, such as the Times Higher Education World University Rankings and QS World University Rankings, which are based in part on reputational surveys among academics.

When measuring by collaboration with other universities (the proportion of number of publications co-authored with other institutions), the top three spots were occupied by National Yang-Ming University and two other institutions from Taiwan in 2014, followed by universities from France, the United Kingdom and a number of other European countries. King Abdulaziz University and King Saud University in Saudi Arabia led the list in 2014 when measured by international collaboration.

== Indicators ==
The Leiden Ranking ranks universities by the following indicators:

=== Citation impact ===
- MCS – mean citation score. The average number of citations of the publications of a university.
- MNCS – mean normalized citation score. The average number of citations of the publications of a university, normalized for field differences and publication year. For example, an MNCS value of 2 means that the publications of a university have been cited twice above world average.
- PP(top 10%) – proportion of top 10% publications. The proportion of the publications of a university that belong to the top 10% most frequently cited, compared with other publications in the same field and in the same year.

=== Scientific collaboration ===
- PP(collab) – proportion of interinstitutionally collaborative publications. The proportion of the publications of a university that have been co-authored with one or more other organizations.
- PP(int collab) – proportion of internationally collaborative publications. The proportion of the publications of a university that have been co-authored by two or more countries.
- PP(UI collab) – proportion of collaborative publications with industry. The proportion of the publications of a university that have been co-authored with one or more industrial partners.
- PP(<100 km) – proportion of short-distance collaborative publications. The proportion of the publications of a university with a geographical collaboration distance of less than 100 km.
- PP(>1000 km) – proportion of long-distance collaborative publications. The proportion of the publications of a university with a geographical collaboration distance of more than 1000 km.

== Criticism ==
In a 2010 article, Loet Leydesdorff criticized the method used by the Leiden Ranking to normalize citation impact by subject field. The mean normalized citation score (MNCS) indicator is based on the ISI subject category classification used in Web of Science, which was "not designed for the scientometric evaluation, but for the purpose of information retrieval". Also, normalizing at a higher aggregation level, rather than at the level of individual publications, gives more weight to older publications, particularly reviews, and to publications in fields where citation levels are traditionally higher.
